

439001–439100 

|-bgcolor=#d6d6d6
| 439001 ||  || — || September 15, 2004 || Siding Spring || SSS || — || align=right | 3.2 km || 
|-id=002 bgcolor=#C2FFFF
| 439002 ||  || — || November 5, 2010 || Mount Lemmon || Mount Lemmon Survey || L4 || align=right | 8.4 km || 
|-id=003 bgcolor=#C2FFFF
| 439003 ||  || — || November 23, 1998 || Kitt Peak || Spacewatch || L4 || align=right | 7.9 km || 
|-id=004 bgcolor=#d6d6d6
| 439004 ||  || — || September 16, 2010 || Mount Lemmon || Mount Lemmon Survey || EOS || align=right | 2.2 km || 
|-id=005 bgcolor=#d6d6d6
| 439005 ||  || — || November 30, 2003 || Kitt Peak || Spacewatch || SYL7:4 || align=right | 4.6 km || 
|-id=006 bgcolor=#fefefe
| 439006 ||  || — || October 16, 2007 || Catalina || CSS || H || align=right data-sort-value="0.97" | 970 m || 
|-id=007 bgcolor=#FA8072
| 439007 ||  || — || November 19, 2003 || Catalina || CSS || — || align=right data-sort-value="0.68" | 680 m || 
|-id=008 bgcolor=#d6d6d6
| 439008 ||  || — || December 19, 2004 || Socorro || LINEAR || — || align=right | 3.6 km || 
|-id=009 bgcolor=#fefefe
| 439009 ||  || — || January 10, 2011 || Mount Lemmon || Mount Lemmon Survey || — || align=right data-sort-value="0.93" | 930 m || 
|-id=010 bgcolor=#fefefe
| 439010 ||  || — || March 6, 2008 || Mount Lemmon || Mount Lemmon Survey || — || align=right data-sort-value="0.68" | 680 m || 
|-id=011 bgcolor=#fefefe
| 439011 ||  || — || February 28, 2008 || Mount Lemmon || Mount Lemmon Survey || — || align=right data-sort-value="0.65" | 650 m || 
|-id=012 bgcolor=#fefefe
| 439012 ||  || — || March 18, 2005 || Catalina || CSS || — || align=right data-sort-value="0.78" | 780 m || 
|-id=013 bgcolor=#fefefe
| 439013 ||  || — || April 28, 2008 || Kitt Peak || Spacewatch || — || align=right data-sort-value="0.54" | 540 m || 
|-id=014 bgcolor=#fefefe
| 439014 ||  || — || March 9, 2005 || Kitt Peak || Spacewatch || — || align=right data-sort-value="0.64" | 640 m || 
|-id=015 bgcolor=#fefefe
| 439015 ||  || — || December 10, 2010 || Mount Lemmon || Mount Lemmon Survey || — || align=right data-sort-value="0.93" | 930 m || 
|-id=016 bgcolor=#fefefe
| 439016 ||  || — || January 2, 2011 || Mount Lemmon || Mount Lemmon Survey || — || align=right data-sort-value="0.72" | 720 m || 
|-id=017 bgcolor=#E9E9E9
| 439017 ||  || — || January 11, 2011 || Kitt Peak || Spacewatch || — || align=right | 2.1 km || 
|-id=018 bgcolor=#fefefe
| 439018 ||  || — || April 20, 2004 || Socorro || LINEAR || — || align=right data-sort-value="0.90" | 900 m || 
|-id=019 bgcolor=#fefefe
| 439019 ||  || — || February 26, 2011 || Kitt Peak || Spacewatch || — || align=right data-sort-value="0.74" | 740 m || 
|-id=020 bgcolor=#fefefe
| 439020 ||  || — || January 2, 2011 || Mount Lemmon || Mount Lemmon Survey || — || align=right data-sort-value="0.73" | 730 m || 
|-id=021 bgcolor=#fefefe
| 439021 ||  || — || March 30, 2008 || Kitt Peak || Spacewatch || — || align=right data-sort-value="0.68" | 680 m || 
|-id=022 bgcolor=#fefefe
| 439022 ||  || — || March 11, 2000 || Socorro || LINEAR || — || align=right data-sort-value="0.74" | 740 m || 
|-id=023 bgcolor=#fefefe
| 439023 ||  || — || April 22, 2004 || Kitt Peak || Spacewatch || — || align=right data-sort-value="0.66" | 660 m || 
|-id=024 bgcolor=#fefefe
| 439024 ||  || — || June 2, 2008 || Mount Lemmon || Mount Lemmon Survey || — || align=right data-sort-value="0.68" | 680 m || 
|-id=025 bgcolor=#fefefe
| 439025 ||  || — || October 7, 2005 || Mount Lemmon || Mount Lemmon Survey || — || align=right data-sort-value="0.90" | 900 m || 
|-id=026 bgcolor=#fefefe
| 439026 ||  || — || February 5, 2011 || Catalina || CSS || — || align=right data-sort-value="0.80" | 800 m || 
|-id=027 bgcolor=#fefefe
| 439027 ||  || — || November 18, 2006 || Kitt Peak || Spacewatch || — || align=right data-sort-value="0.69" | 690 m || 
|-id=028 bgcolor=#fefefe
| 439028 ||  || — || December 13, 2006 || Kitt Peak || Spacewatch || — || align=right data-sort-value="0.69" | 690 m || 
|-id=029 bgcolor=#fefefe
| 439029 ||  || — || February 28, 2000 || Socorro || LINEAR || — || align=right data-sort-value="0.89" | 890 m || 
|-id=030 bgcolor=#fefefe
| 439030 ||  || — || March 13, 2011 || Kitt Peak || Spacewatch || V || align=right data-sort-value="0.70" | 700 m || 
|-id=031 bgcolor=#fefefe
| 439031 ||  || — || March 20, 2004 || Socorro || LINEAR || — || align=right data-sort-value="0.86" | 860 m || 
|-id=032 bgcolor=#fefefe
| 439032 ||  || — || October 27, 2006 || Mount Lemmon || Mount Lemmon Survey || — || align=right data-sort-value="0.79" | 790 m || 
|-id=033 bgcolor=#fefefe
| 439033 ||  || — || February 16, 2007 || Catalina || CSS || — || align=right data-sort-value="0.75" | 750 m || 
|-id=034 bgcolor=#fefefe
| 439034 ||  || — || March 25, 2011 || Kitt Peak || Spacewatch || — || align=right data-sort-value="0.72" | 720 m || 
|-id=035 bgcolor=#fefefe
| 439035 ||  || — || October 1, 2005 || Kitt Peak || Spacewatch || — || align=right data-sort-value="0.91" | 910 m || 
|-id=036 bgcolor=#E9E9E9
| 439036 ||  || — || September 3, 2008 || Kitt Peak || Spacewatch || EUN || align=right | 1.3 km || 
|-id=037 bgcolor=#fefefe
| 439037 ||  || — || March 13, 2011 || Kitt Peak || Spacewatch || NYS || align=right data-sort-value="0.69" | 690 m || 
|-id=038 bgcolor=#fefefe
| 439038 ||  || — || May 19, 2004 || Kitt Peak || Spacewatch || NYS || align=right data-sort-value="0.66" | 660 m || 
|-id=039 bgcolor=#fefefe
| 439039 ||  || — || February 8, 2007 || Mount Lemmon || Mount Lemmon Survey || — || align=right data-sort-value="0.92" | 920 m || 
|-id=040 bgcolor=#fefefe
| 439040 ||  || — || June 8, 1997 || Kitt Peak || Spacewatch || V || align=right data-sort-value="0.56" | 560 m || 
|-id=041 bgcolor=#fefefe
| 439041 ||  || — || March 5, 2011 || Kitt Peak || Spacewatch || MAS || align=right data-sort-value="0.78" | 780 m || 
|-id=042 bgcolor=#fefefe
| 439042 ||  || — || January 26, 2007 || Kitt Peak || Spacewatch || — || align=right data-sort-value="0.82" | 820 m || 
|-id=043 bgcolor=#fefefe
| 439043 ||  || — || March 14, 2011 || Mount Lemmon || Mount Lemmon Survey || — || align=right data-sort-value="0.70" | 700 m || 
|-id=044 bgcolor=#fefefe
| 439044 ||  || — || November 22, 2009 || Kitt Peak || Spacewatch || — || align=right data-sort-value="0.79" | 790 m || 
|-id=045 bgcolor=#fefefe
| 439045 ||  || — || February 25, 2011 || Mount Lemmon || Mount Lemmon Survey || — || align=right data-sort-value="0.68" | 680 m || 
|-id=046 bgcolor=#fefefe
| 439046 ||  || — || March 27, 2011 || Mount Lemmon || Mount Lemmon Survey || — || align=right data-sort-value="0.99" | 990 m || 
|-id=047 bgcolor=#E9E9E9
| 439047 ||  || — || February 26, 2007 || Mount Lemmon || Mount Lemmon Survey || — || align=right | 1.9 km || 
|-id=048 bgcolor=#fefefe
| 439048 ||  || — || April 23, 2004 || Campo Imperatore || CINEOS || NYS || align=right data-sort-value="0.60" | 600 m || 
|-id=049 bgcolor=#fefefe
| 439049 ||  || — || November 16, 2009 || Mount Lemmon || Mount Lemmon Survey || — || align=right data-sort-value="0.72" | 720 m || 
|-id=050 bgcolor=#fefefe
| 439050 ||  || — || October 22, 2005 || Catalina || CSS || — || align=right data-sort-value="0.86" | 860 m || 
|-id=051 bgcolor=#fefefe
| 439051 ||  || — || November 4, 2005 || Kitt Peak || Spacewatch || — || align=right | 1.1 km || 
|-id=052 bgcolor=#fefefe
| 439052 ||  || — || February 9, 2007 || Mount Lemmon || Mount Lemmon Survey || — || align=right data-sort-value="0.65" | 650 m || 
|-id=053 bgcolor=#fefefe
| 439053 ||  || — || April 23, 2011 || Catalina || CSS || — || align=right | 1.2 km || 
|-id=054 bgcolor=#fefefe
| 439054 ||  || — || March 4, 2011 || Mount Lemmon || Mount Lemmon Survey || — || align=right | 1.1 km || 
|-id=055 bgcolor=#fefefe
| 439055 ||  || — || March 14, 2011 || Kitt Peak || Spacewatch || — || align=right data-sort-value="0.68" | 680 m || 
|-id=056 bgcolor=#fefefe
| 439056 ||  || — || April 4, 2011 || Kitt Peak || Spacewatch || — || align=right data-sort-value="0.78" | 780 m || 
|-id=057 bgcolor=#fefefe
| 439057 ||  || — || November 19, 2006 || Kitt Peak || Spacewatch || — || align=right data-sort-value="0.62" | 620 m || 
|-id=058 bgcolor=#fefefe
| 439058 ||  || — || March 28, 2011 || Kitt Peak || Spacewatch || — || align=right data-sort-value="0.78" | 780 m || 
|-id=059 bgcolor=#E9E9E9
| 439059 ||  || — || April 26, 2011 || Kitt Peak || Spacewatch || — || align=right | 1.9 km || 
|-id=060 bgcolor=#fefefe
| 439060 ||  || — || March 10, 2007 || Kitt Peak || Spacewatch || V || align=right data-sort-value="0.71" | 710 m || 
|-id=061 bgcolor=#E9E9E9
| 439061 ||  || — || May 10, 2007 || Mount Lemmon || Mount Lemmon Survey || — || align=right data-sort-value="0.92" | 920 m || 
|-id=062 bgcolor=#fefefe
| 439062 ||  || — || February 23, 2007 || Kitt Peak || Spacewatch || — || align=right data-sort-value="0.68" | 680 m || 
|-id=063 bgcolor=#fefefe
| 439063 ||  || — || April 27, 2011 || Kitt Peak || Spacewatch || — || align=right data-sort-value="0.98" | 980 m || 
|-id=064 bgcolor=#fefefe
| 439064 ||  || — || March 13, 2007 || Kitt Peak || Spacewatch || — || align=right data-sort-value="0.72" | 720 m || 
|-id=065 bgcolor=#fefefe
| 439065 ||  || — || May 13, 2004 || Kitt Peak || Spacewatch || — || align=right data-sort-value="0.62" | 620 m || 
|-id=066 bgcolor=#fefefe
| 439066 ||  || — || November 1, 2005 || Mount Lemmon || Mount Lemmon Survey || — || align=right data-sort-value="0.70" | 700 m || 
|-id=067 bgcolor=#fefefe
| 439067 ||  || — || September 20, 2001 || Socorro || LINEAR || — || align=right data-sort-value="0.71" | 710 m || 
|-id=068 bgcolor=#fefefe
| 439068 ||  || — || April 24, 2011 || Kitt Peak || Spacewatch || — || align=right | 1.1 km || 
|-id=069 bgcolor=#fefefe
| 439069 ||  || — || September 5, 2008 || Kitt Peak || Spacewatch || — || align=right data-sort-value="0.86" | 860 m || 
|-id=070 bgcolor=#E9E9E9
| 439070 ||  || — || January 27, 2006 || Mount Lemmon || Mount Lemmon Survey || — || align=right | 1.1 km || 
|-id=071 bgcolor=#fefefe
| 439071 ||  || — || September 29, 2008 || Catalina || CSS || — || align=right data-sort-value="0.89" | 890 m || 
|-id=072 bgcolor=#fefefe
| 439072 ||  || — || October 6, 2008 || Mount Lemmon || Mount Lemmon Survey || — || align=right data-sort-value="0.81" | 810 m || 
|-id=073 bgcolor=#E9E9E9
| 439073 ||  || — || April 1, 2010 || WISE || WISE || EUN || align=right | 2.3 km || 
|-id=074 bgcolor=#E9E9E9
| 439074 ||  || — || May 23, 2011 || Kitt Peak || Spacewatch || — || align=right | 1.0 km || 
|-id=075 bgcolor=#E9E9E9
| 439075 ||  || — || November 30, 2008 || Kitt Peak || Spacewatch || — || align=right | 1.1 km || 
|-id=076 bgcolor=#fefefe
| 439076 ||  || — || May 21, 2011 || Mount Lemmon || Mount Lemmon Survey || — || align=right data-sort-value="0.86" | 860 m || 
|-id=077 bgcolor=#E9E9E9
| 439077 ||  || — || June 4, 2011 || Mount Lemmon || Mount Lemmon Survey || (5) || align=right data-sort-value="0.92" | 920 m || 
|-id=078 bgcolor=#E9E9E9
| 439078 ||  || — || October 6, 2002 || Socorro || LINEAR || — || align=right | 2.8 km || 
|-id=079 bgcolor=#E9E9E9
| 439079 ||  || — || February 25, 2006 || Kitt Peak || Spacewatch || — || align=right | 1.3 km || 
|-id=080 bgcolor=#E9E9E9
| 439080 ||  || — || September 18, 2003 || Kitt Peak || Spacewatch || RAF || align=right data-sort-value="0.84" | 840 m || 
|-id=081 bgcolor=#E9E9E9
| 439081 ||  || — || June 22, 2011 || Mount Lemmon || Mount Lemmon Survey || — || align=right data-sort-value="0.99" | 990 m || 
|-id=082 bgcolor=#E9E9E9
| 439082 ||  || — || December 30, 2008 || Kitt Peak || Spacewatch || — || align=right | 1.9 km || 
|-id=083 bgcolor=#E9E9E9
| 439083 ||  || — || August 8, 2007 || Socorro || LINEAR || — || align=right | 1.2 km || 
|-id=084 bgcolor=#E9E9E9
| 439084 ||  || — || September 28, 2003 || Kitt Peak || Spacewatch || — || align=right | 1.4 km || 
|-id=085 bgcolor=#E9E9E9
| 439085 ||  || — || July 28, 2011 || Siding Spring || SSS || GEF || align=right | 1.3 km || 
|-id=086 bgcolor=#E9E9E9
| 439086 ||  || — || May 5, 2006 || Siding Spring || SSS || — || align=right | 2.2 km || 
|-id=087 bgcolor=#d6d6d6
| 439087 ||  || — || July 26, 1995 || Kitt Peak || Spacewatch || EOS || align=right | 1.6 km || 
|-id=088 bgcolor=#E9E9E9
| 439088 ||  || — || April 10, 2010 || Mount Lemmon || Mount Lemmon Survey || — || align=right | 2.2 km || 
|-id=089 bgcolor=#E9E9E9
| 439089 ||  || — || October 9, 2007 || Catalina || CSS || — || align=right | 2.0 km || 
|-id=090 bgcolor=#E9E9E9
| 439090 ||  || — || November 11, 1999 || Kitt Peak || Spacewatch || (5)critical || align=right data-sort-value="0.67" | 670 m || 
|-id=091 bgcolor=#d6d6d6
| 439091 ||  || — || April 7, 2005 || Mount Lemmon || Mount Lemmon Survey || BRA || align=right | 2.0 km || 
|-id=092 bgcolor=#E9E9E9
| 439092 ||  || — || September 10, 2007 || Mount Lemmon || Mount Lemmon Survey || — || align=right data-sort-value="0.94" | 940 m || 
|-id=093 bgcolor=#E9E9E9
| 439093 ||  || — || November 20, 2007 || Mount Lemmon || Mount Lemmon Survey || GEF || align=right | 1.5 km || 
|-id=094 bgcolor=#d6d6d6
| 439094 ||  || — || August 27, 2001 || Kitt Peak || Spacewatch || — || align=right | 2.8 km || 
|-id=095 bgcolor=#d6d6d6
| 439095 ||  || — || September 14, 2006 || Kitt Peak || Spacewatch || — || align=right | 2.2 km || 
|-id=096 bgcolor=#d6d6d6
| 439096 ||  || — || April 9, 2010 || WISE || WISE || — || align=right | 3.3 km || 
|-id=097 bgcolor=#E9E9E9
| 439097 ||  || — || August 22, 2007 || Kitt Peak || Spacewatch || (1547) || align=right | 2.0 km || 
|-id=098 bgcolor=#E9E9E9
| 439098 ||  || — || October 9, 2007 || Catalina || CSS || — || align=right | 1.6 km || 
|-id=099 bgcolor=#d6d6d6
| 439099 ||  || — || September 21, 2011 || Kitt Peak || Spacewatch || — || align=right | 2.8 km || 
|-id=100 bgcolor=#E9E9E9
| 439100 ||  || — || September 19, 1998 || Anderson Mesa || LONEOS || — || align=right | 1.7 km || 
|}

439101–439200 

|-bgcolor=#E9E9E9
| 439101 ||  || — || August 27, 2006 || Kitt Peak || Spacewatch || — || align=right | 2.0 km || 
|-id=102 bgcolor=#E9E9E9
| 439102 ||  || — || October 21, 2007 || Kitt Peak || Spacewatch || — || align=right | 2.1 km || 
|-id=103 bgcolor=#E9E9E9
| 439103 ||  || — || October 14, 2007 || Catalina || CSS || — || align=right | 1.5 km || 
|-id=104 bgcolor=#E9E9E9
| 439104 ||  || — || September 14, 2007 || Mount Lemmon || Mount Lemmon Survey || — || align=right | 1.7 km || 
|-id=105 bgcolor=#E9E9E9
| 439105 ||  || — || November 6, 2007 || Kitt Peak || Spacewatch || — || align=right | 1.4 km || 
|-id=106 bgcolor=#E9E9E9
| 439106 ||  || — || December 19, 2007 || Kitt Peak || Spacewatch || — || align=right | 1.4 km || 
|-id=107 bgcolor=#E9E9E9
| 439107 ||  || — || September 15, 1998 || Anderson Mesa || LONEOS || — || align=right | 1.7 km || 
|-id=108 bgcolor=#d6d6d6
| 439108 ||  || — || April 17, 2010 || WISE || WISE || — || align=right | 3.2 km || 
|-id=109 bgcolor=#d6d6d6
| 439109 ||  || — || January 11, 2008 || Kitt Peak || Spacewatch || VER || align=right | 2.9 km || 
|-id=110 bgcolor=#E9E9E9
| 439110 ||  || — || November 2, 2007 || Mount Lemmon || Mount Lemmon Survey || — || align=right | 2.3 km || 
|-id=111 bgcolor=#d6d6d6
| 439111 ||  || — || September 13, 2005 || Kitt Peak || Spacewatch || — || align=right | 3.1 km || 
|-id=112 bgcolor=#E9E9E9
| 439112 ||  || — || September 22, 2011 || Kitt Peak || Spacewatch || HOF || align=right | 2.9 km || 
|-id=113 bgcolor=#E9E9E9
| 439113 ||  || — || November 3, 2007 || Kitt Peak || Spacewatch || NEM || align=right | 1.9 km || 
|-id=114 bgcolor=#E9E9E9
| 439114 ||  || — || May 9, 2010 || Mount Lemmon || Mount Lemmon Survey || — || align=right | 1.4 km || 
|-id=115 bgcolor=#d6d6d6
| 439115 ||  || — || July 3, 2005 || Mount Lemmon || Mount Lemmon Survey || TEL || align=right | 1.8 km || 
|-id=116 bgcolor=#E9E9E9
| 439116 ||  || — || January 16, 2009 || Kitt Peak || Spacewatch || — || align=right | 1.8 km || 
|-id=117 bgcolor=#E9E9E9
| 439117 ||  || — || September 11, 2007 || Kitt Peak || Spacewatch || MAR || align=right | 1.4 km || 
|-id=118 bgcolor=#E9E9E9
| 439118 ||  || — || September 20, 2011 || Kitt Peak || Spacewatch || AEO || align=right | 1.2 km || 
|-id=119 bgcolor=#E9E9E9
| 439119 ||  || — || November 2, 2007 || Kitt Peak || Spacewatch || MIS || align=right | 2.4 km || 
|-id=120 bgcolor=#d6d6d6
| 439120 ||  || — || November 3, 2007 || Mount Lemmon || Mount Lemmon Survey || — || align=right | 2.9 km || 
|-id=121 bgcolor=#d6d6d6
| 439121 ||  || — || October 21, 2006 || Mount Lemmon || Mount Lemmon Survey || — || align=right | 2.3 km || 
|-id=122 bgcolor=#d6d6d6
| 439122 ||  || — || February 7, 2008 || Kitt Peak || Spacewatch || HYG || align=right | 2.6 km || 
|-id=123 bgcolor=#E9E9E9
| 439123 ||  || — || February 22, 2009 || Kitt Peak || Spacewatch || — || align=right | 2.1 km || 
|-id=124 bgcolor=#E9E9E9
| 439124 ||  || — || April 2, 2005 || Mount Lemmon || Mount Lemmon Survey || — || align=right | 2.1 km || 
|-id=125 bgcolor=#E9E9E9
| 439125 ||  || — || March 11, 2005 || Mount Lemmon || Mount Lemmon Survey || — || align=right | 2.0 km || 
|-id=126 bgcolor=#d6d6d6
| 439126 ||  || — || September 25, 2006 || Mount Lemmon || Mount Lemmon Survey || — || align=right | 2.2 km || 
|-id=127 bgcolor=#d6d6d6
| 439127 ||  || — || September 18, 2011 || Mount Lemmon || Mount Lemmon Survey || — || align=right | 2.4 km || 
|-id=128 bgcolor=#d6d6d6
| 439128 ||  || — || April 11, 2010 || WISE || WISE || — || align=right | 3.0 km || 
|-id=129 bgcolor=#d6d6d6
| 439129 ||  || — || October 23, 2006 || Mount Lemmon || Mount Lemmon Survey || — || align=right | 3.3 km || 
|-id=130 bgcolor=#E9E9E9
| 439130 ||  || — || March 10, 2005 || Mount Lemmon || Mount Lemmon Survey || — || align=right | 2.4 km || 
|-id=131 bgcolor=#E9E9E9
| 439131 ||  || — || December 15, 2007 || Socorro || LINEAR || (1547) || align=right | 1.5 km || 
|-id=132 bgcolor=#d6d6d6
| 439132 ||  || — || April 13, 2004 || Kitt Peak || Spacewatch || EOS || align=right | 1.6 km || 
|-id=133 bgcolor=#E9E9E9
| 439133 ||  || — || January 15, 2004 || Kitt Peak || Spacewatch || AST || align=right | 1.6 km || 
|-id=134 bgcolor=#d6d6d6
| 439134 ||  || — || October 6, 2011 || Mount Lemmon || Mount Lemmon Survey || — || align=right | 3.8 km || 
|-id=135 bgcolor=#d6d6d6
| 439135 ||  || — || December 21, 2006 || Kitt Peak || Spacewatch || — || align=right | 3.1 km || 
|-id=136 bgcolor=#d6d6d6
| 439136 ||  || — || March 31, 2009 || Kitt Peak || Spacewatch || — || align=right | 4.1 km || 
|-id=137 bgcolor=#d6d6d6
| 439137 ||  || — || January 11, 2008 || Kitt Peak || Spacewatch || — || align=right | 2.0 km || 
|-id=138 bgcolor=#E9E9E9
| 439138 ||  || — || May 22, 2006 || Kitt Peak || Spacewatch || — || align=right | 1.5 km || 
|-id=139 bgcolor=#E9E9E9
| 439139 ||  || — || October 1, 2011 || Kitt Peak || Spacewatch || — || align=right | 2.2 km || 
|-id=140 bgcolor=#d6d6d6
| 439140 ||  || — || October 1, 2000 || Socorro || LINEAR || — || align=right | 3.3 km || 
|-id=141 bgcolor=#d6d6d6
| 439141 ||  || — || December 11, 2006 || Kitt Peak || Spacewatch || THM || align=right | 2.4 km || 
|-id=142 bgcolor=#d6d6d6
| 439142 ||  || — || November 27, 2000 || Kitt Peak || Spacewatch || — || align=right | 3.5 km || 
|-id=143 bgcolor=#d6d6d6
| 439143 ||  || — || October 6, 2011 || Mount Lemmon || Mount Lemmon Survey || — || align=right | 2.7 km || 
|-id=144 bgcolor=#d6d6d6
| 439144 ||  || — || October 17, 2006 || Kitt Peak || Spacewatch || NAE || align=right | 2.1 km || 
|-id=145 bgcolor=#d6d6d6
| 439145 ||  || — || April 5, 2008 || Mount Lemmon || Mount Lemmon Survey || — || align=right | 2.6 km || 
|-id=146 bgcolor=#E9E9E9
| 439146 ||  || — || December 31, 1999 || Kitt Peak || Spacewatch || — || align=right | 1.1 km || 
|-id=147 bgcolor=#d6d6d6
| 439147 ||  || — || October 1, 2000 || Socorro || LINEAR || — || align=right | 2.9 km || 
|-id=148 bgcolor=#E9E9E9
| 439148 ||  || — || November 13, 2007 || Mount Lemmon || Mount Lemmon Survey || — || align=right | 2.6 km || 
|-id=149 bgcolor=#E9E9E9
| 439149 ||  || — || June 24, 2010 || WISE || WISE || — || align=right | 1.0 km || 
|-id=150 bgcolor=#d6d6d6
| 439150 ||  || — || July 4, 2010 || Mount Lemmon || Mount Lemmon Survey || — || align=right | 3.2 km || 
|-id=151 bgcolor=#d6d6d6
| 439151 ||  || — || January 18, 2008 || Kitt Peak || Spacewatch || — || align=right | 1.9 km || 
|-id=152 bgcolor=#E9E9E9
| 439152 ||  || — || February 1, 2009 || Mount Lemmon || Mount Lemmon Survey || — || align=right | 2.6 km || 
|-id=153 bgcolor=#d6d6d6
| 439153 ||  || — || September 28, 2006 || Kitt Peak || Spacewatch || KOR || align=right | 1.3 km || 
|-id=154 bgcolor=#d6d6d6
| 439154 ||  || — || February 13, 2008 || Kitt Peak || Spacewatch || — || align=right | 3.8 km || 
|-id=155 bgcolor=#d6d6d6
| 439155 ||  || — || April 8, 2010 || WISE || WISE || — || align=right | 2.5 km || 
|-id=156 bgcolor=#E9E9E9
| 439156 ||  || — || October 22, 2011 || Kitt Peak || Spacewatch || — || align=right | 1.9 km || 
|-id=157 bgcolor=#d6d6d6
| 439157 ||  || — || April 21, 2009 || Mount Lemmon || Mount Lemmon Survey || EOS || align=right | 1.9 km || 
|-id=158 bgcolor=#d6d6d6
| 439158 ||  || — || December 22, 2006 || Socorro || LINEAR || — || align=right | 4.2 km || 
|-id=159 bgcolor=#d6d6d6
| 439159 ||  || — || November 5, 1994 || Kitt Peak || Spacewatch || — || align=right | 3.3 km || 
|-id=160 bgcolor=#d6d6d6
| 439160 ||  || — || February 24, 2009 || Kitt Peak || Spacewatch || KOR || align=right | 1.3 km || 
|-id=161 bgcolor=#d6d6d6
| 439161 ||  || — || May 13, 2009 || Mount Lemmon || Mount Lemmon Survey || — || align=right | 3.9 km || 
|-id=162 bgcolor=#d6d6d6
| 439162 ||  || — || October 23, 2006 || Mount Lemmon || Mount Lemmon Survey || EOS || align=right | 1.8 km || 
|-id=163 bgcolor=#E9E9E9
| 439163 ||  || — || May 19, 2010 || Mount Lemmon || Mount Lemmon Survey || — || align=right | 2.5 km || 
|-id=164 bgcolor=#E9E9E9
| 439164 ||  || — || September 24, 2011 || Catalina || CSS || — || align=right | 2.5 km || 
|-id=165 bgcolor=#d6d6d6
| 439165 ||  || — || April 17, 2010 || WISE || WISE || — || align=right | 4.3 km || 
|-id=166 bgcolor=#E9E9E9
| 439166 ||  || — || December 5, 2002 || Socorro || LINEAR || — || align=right | 1.9 km || 
|-id=167 bgcolor=#d6d6d6
| 439167 ||  || — || November 17, 2006 || Kitt Peak || Spacewatch || — || align=right | 3.3 km || 
|-id=168 bgcolor=#d6d6d6
| 439168 ||  || — || October 27, 2011 || Mount Lemmon || Mount Lemmon Survey || — || align=right | 2.7 km || 
|-id=169 bgcolor=#E9E9E9
| 439169 ||  || — || January 17, 2010 || WISE || WISE || — || align=right | 2.3 km || 
|-id=170 bgcolor=#d6d6d6
| 439170 ||  || — || April 27, 2009 || Kitt Peak || Spacewatch || — || align=right | 3.0 km || 
|-id=171 bgcolor=#E9E9E9
| 439171 ||  || — || July 8, 2010 || WISE || WISE || — || align=right | 3.4 km || 
|-id=172 bgcolor=#d6d6d6
| 439172 ||  || — || May 18, 2010 || WISE || WISE || — || align=right | 2.9 km || 
|-id=173 bgcolor=#d6d6d6
| 439173 ||  || — || January 17, 2007 || Kitt Peak || Spacewatch || THM || align=right | 2.3 km || 
|-id=174 bgcolor=#d6d6d6
| 439174 ||  || — || November 4, 2010 || Mount Lemmon || Mount Lemmon Survey || — || align=right | 4.5 km || 
|-id=175 bgcolor=#d6d6d6
| 439175 ||  || — || November 19, 2006 || Kitt Peak || Spacewatch || — || align=right | 2.2 km || 
|-id=176 bgcolor=#d6d6d6
| 439176 ||  || — || May 12, 2010 || WISE || WISE || — || align=right | 2.9 km || 
|-id=177 bgcolor=#d6d6d6
| 439177 ||  || — || September 5, 2010 || Mount Lemmon || Mount Lemmon Survey || — || align=right | 3.5 km || 
|-id=178 bgcolor=#E9E9E9
| 439178 ||  || — || May 8, 2005 || Kitt Peak || Spacewatch || — || align=right | 1.8 km || 
|-id=179 bgcolor=#d6d6d6
| 439179 ||  || — || June 12, 2010 || WISE || WISE || — || align=right | 5.7 km || 
|-id=180 bgcolor=#d6d6d6
| 439180 ||  || — || December 11, 2006 || Kitt Peak || Spacewatch || — || align=right | 3.2 km || 
|-id=181 bgcolor=#d6d6d6
| 439181 ||  || — || June 18, 2010 || WISE || WISE || — || align=right | 4.0 km || 
|-id=182 bgcolor=#d6d6d6
| 439182 ||  || — || August 20, 2004 || Catalina || CSS || — || align=right | 4.3 km || 
|-id=183 bgcolor=#d6d6d6
| 439183 ||  || — || October 30, 2011 || Kitt Peak || Spacewatch || — || align=right | 2.3 km || 
|-id=184 bgcolor=#d6d6d6
| 439184 ||  || — || March 19, 2009 || Kitt Peak || Spacewatch || EOS || align=right | 1.7 km || 
|-id=185 bgcolor=#d6d6d6
| 439185 ||  || — || September 30, 2000 || Anderson Mesa || LONEOS || — || align=right | 3.4 km || 
|-id=186 bgcolor=#d6d6d6
| 439186 ||  || — || October 21, 2011 || Mount Lemmon || Mount Lemmon Survey || — || align=right | 3.2 km || 
|-id=187 bgcolor=#d6d6d6
| 439187 ||  || — || November 26, 2011 || Mount Lemmon || Mount Lemmon Survey || — || align=right | 2.9 km || 
|-id=188 bgcolor=#d6d6d6
| 439188 ||  || — || July 5, 2005 || Siding Spring || SSS || — || align=right | 3.1 km || 
|-id=189 bgcolor=#d6d6d6
| 439189 ||  || — || October 31, 2005 || Catalina || CSS || — || align=right | 4.0 km || 
|-id=190 bgcolor=#d6d6d6
| 439190 ||  || — || October 1, 2005 || Catalina || CSS || — || align=right | 2.6 km || 
|-id=191 bgcolor=#d6d6d6
| 439191 ||  || — || December 21, 2005 || Catalina || CSS || Tj (2.98) || align=right | 4.7 km || 
|-id=192 bgcolor=#d6d6d6
| 439192 ||  || — || June 7, 2010 || WISE || WISE || — || align=right | 3.3 km || 
|-id=193 bgcolor=#d6d6d6
| 439193 ||  || — || October 22, 2011 || Mount Lemmon || Mount Lemmon Survey || — || align=right | 3.2 km || 
|-id=194 bgcolor=#d6d6d6
| 439194 ||  || — || October 13, 2010 || Mount Lemmon || Mount Lemmon Survey || 7:4 || align=right | 4.3 km || 
|-id=195 bgcolor=#d6d6d6
| 439195 ||  || — || November 30, 2010 || Catalina || CSS || — || align=right | 4.1 km || 
|-id=196 bgcolor=#d6d6d6
| 439196 ||  || — || December 24, 2005 || Socorro || LINEAR || — || align=right | 4.0 km || 
|-id=197 bgcolor=#C2FFFF
| 439197 ||  || — || December 24, 2011 || Mount Lemmon || Mount Lemmon Survey || L4 || align=right | 13 km || 
|-id=198 bgcolor=#d6d6d6
| 439198 ||  || — || January 19, 2001 || Socorro || LINEAR || — || align=right | 3.9 km || 
|-id=199 bgcolor=#d6d6d6
| 439199 ||  || — || September 14, 2009 || Kitt Peak || Spacewatch || 7:4 || align=right | 3.8 km || 
|-id=200 bgcolor=#fefefe
| 439200 ||  || — || April 19, 2007 || Catalina || CSS || H || align=right data-sort-value="0.88" | 880 m || 
|}

439201–439300 

|-bgcolor=#fefefe
| 439201 ||  || — || January 28, 2007 || Kitt Peak || Spacewatch || H || align=right data-sort-value="0.68" | 680 m || 
|-id=202 bgcolor=#FA8072
| 439202 ||  || — || January 23, 2012 || Catalina || CSS || H || align=right data-sort-value="0.68" | 680 m || 
|-id=203 bgcolor=#fefefe
| 439203 ||  || — || April 25, 2008 || Mount Lemmon || Mount Lemmon Survey || — || align=right | 2.2 km || 
|-id=204 bgcolor=#fefefe
| 439204 ||  || — || December 24, 2005 || Kitt Peak || Spacewatch || MAS || align=right data-sort-value="0.81" | 810 m || 
|-id=205 bgcolor=#fefefe
| 439205 ||  || — || February 17, 2004 || Kitt Peak || Spacewatch || — || align=right data-sort-value="0.83" | 830 m || 
|-id=206 bgcolor=#E9E9E9
| 439206 ||  || — || December 11, 2004 || Kitt Peak || Spacewatch || — || align=right | 1.4 km || 
|-id=207 bgcolor=#E9E9E9
| 439207 ||  || — || November 9, 1999 || Socorro || LINEAR || — || align=right | 1.5 km || 
|-id=208 bgcolor=#fefefe
| 439208 ||  || — || February 23, 2007 || Mount Lemmon || Mount Lemmon Survey || — || align=right data-sort-value="0.91" | 910 m || 
|-id=209 bgcolor=#E9E9E9
| 439209 ||  || — || November 30, 2003 || Kitt Peak || Spacewatch || — || align=right | 2.3 km || 
|-id=210 bgcolor=#fefefe
| 439210 ||  || — || October 25, 2005 || Kitt Peak || Spacewatch || — || align=right data-sort-value="0.62" | 620 m || 
|-id=211 bgcolor=#fefefe
| 439211 ||  || — || April 13, 2011 || Mount Lemmon || Mount Lemmon Survey || — || align=right data-sort-value="0.76" | 760 m || 
|-id=212 bgcolor=#fefefe
| 439212 ||  || — || September 17, 2012 || Kitt Peak || Spacewatch || — || align=right data-sort-value="0.70" | 700 m || 
|-id=213 bgcolor=#fefefe
| 439213 ||  || — || September 25, 2005 || Kitt Peak || Spacewatch || — || align=right data-sort-value="0.94" | 940 m || 
|-id=214 bgcolor=#fefefe
| 439214 ||  || — || February 15, 2010 || Mount Lemmon || Mount Lemmon Survey || — || align=right data-sort-value="0.83" | 830 m || 
|-id=215 bgcolor=#fefefe
| 439215 ||  || — || October 7, 2005 || Catalina || CSS || — || align=right data-sort-value="0.87" | 870 m || 
|-id=216 bgcolor=#fefefe
| 439216 ||  || — || September 17, 2012 || Kitt Peak || Spacewatch || — || align=right | 1.1 km || 
|-id=217 bgcolor=#fefefe
| 439217 ||  || — || October 16, 2001 || Kitt Peak || Spacewatch || V || align=right data-sort-value="0.54" | 540 m || 
|-id=218 bgcolor=#fefefe
| 439218 ||  || — || May 3, 1994 || Kitt Peak || Spacewatch || — || align=right data-sort-value="0.66" | 660 m || 
|-id=219 bgcolor=#fefefe
| 439219 ||  || — || October 1, 2005 || Mount Lemmon || Mount Lemmon Survey || — || align=right data-sort-value="0.75" | 750 m || 
|-id=220 bgcolor=#fefefe
| 439220 ||  || — || December 15, 2009 || Mount Lemmon || Mount Lemmon Survey || — || align=right data-sort-value="0.79" | 790 m || 
|-id=221 bgcolor=#E9E9E9
| 439221 ||  || — || March 19, 2010 || Kitt Peak || Spacewatch || — || align=right | 2.2 km || 
|-id=222 bgcolor=#fefefe
| 439222 ||  || — || August 29, 2005 || Kitt Peak || Spacewatch || (2076) || align=right data-sort-value="0.75" | 750 m || 
|-id=223 bgcolor=#E9E9E9
| 439223 ||  || — || November 20, 2008 || Mount Lemmon || Mount Lemmon Survey || — || align=right | 1.4 km || 
|-id=224 bgcolor=#fefefe
| 439224 ||  || — || September 30, 2005 || Mount Lemmon || Mount Lemmon Survey || — || align=right data-sort-value="0.75" | 750 m || 
|-id=225 bgcolor=#E9E9E9
| 439225 ||  || — || December 3, 2008 || Socorro || LINEAR || — || align=right | 1.7 km || 
|-id=226 bgcolor=#E9E9E9
| 439226 ||  || — || October 23, 2008 || Mount Lemmon || Mount Lemmon Survey || — || align=right | 1.1 km || 
|-id=227 bgcolor=#fefefe
| 439227 ||  || — || September 25, 2005 || Kitt Peak || Spacewatch || — || align=right data-sort-value="0.78" | 780 m || 
|-id=228 bgcolor=#E9E9E9
| 439228 ||  || — || September 17, 2012 || Kitt Peak || Spacewatch || — || align=right | 1.5 km || 
|-id=229 bgcolor=#E9E9E9
| 439229 ||  || — || April 26, 2006 || Kitt Peak || Spacewatch || — || align=right | 1.4 km || 
|-id=230 bgcolor=#fefefe
| 439230 ||  || — || April 18, 2007 || Mount Lemmon || Mount Lemmon Survey || — || align=right | 1.0 km || 
|-id=231 bgcolor=#d6d6d6
| 439231 ||  || — || April 7, 2005 || Kitt Peak || Spacewatch || — || align=right | 2.4 km || 
|-id=232 bgcolor=#fefefe
| 439232 ||  || — || December 21, 2005 || Kitt Peak || Spacewatch || — || align=right data-sort-value="0.98" | 980 m || 
|-id=233 bgcolor=#fefefe
| 439233 ||  || — || April 24, 2008 || Mount Lemmon || Mount Lemmon Survey || — || align=right data-sort-value="0.66" | 660 m || 
|-id=234 bgcolor=#E9E9E9
| 439234 ||  || — || October 9, 2012 || Mount Lemmon || Mount Lemmon Survey || WIT || align=right | 1.1 km || 
|-id=235 bgcolor=#fefefe
| 439235 ||  || — || January 14, 2010 || Kitt Peak || Spacewatch || — || align=right data-sort-value="0.71" | 710 m || 
|-id=236 bgcolor=#fefefe
| 439236 ||  || — || August 27, 2001 || Kitt Peak || Spacewatch || — || align=right data-sort-value="0.57" | 570 m || 
|-id=237 bgcolor=#fefefe
| 439237 ||  || — || March 27, 2011 || Mount Lemmon || Mount Lemmon Survey || — || align=right data-sort-value="0.85" | 850 m || 
|-id=238 bgcolor=#fefefe
| 439238 ||  || — || November 5, 2005 || Kitt Peak || Spacewatch || — || align=right data-sort-value="0.70" | 700 m || 
|-id=239 bgcolor=#fefefe
| 439239 ||  || — || September 13, 1999 || Kitt Peak || Spacewatch || — || align=right data-sort-value="0.70" | 700 m || 
|-id=240 bgcolor=#E9E9E9
| 439240 ||  || — || January 17, 2005 || Kitt Peak || Spacewatch || — || align=right | 1.6 km || 
|-id=241 bgcolor=#E9E9E9
| 439241 ||  || — || October 9, 2012 || Mount Lemmon || Mount Lemmon Survey || AGN || align=right data-sort-value="0.98" | 980 m || 
|-id=242 bgcolor=#fefefe
| 439242 ||  || — || December 24, 2005 || Kitt Peak || Spacewatch || NYS || align=right data-sort-value="0.79" | 790 m || 
|-id=243 bgcolor=#E9E9E9
| 439243 ||  || — || November 19, 2008 || Mount Lemmon || Mount Lemmon Survey || — || align=right | 2.4 km || 
|-id=244 bgcolor=#E9E9E9
| 439244 ||  || — || October 10, 2008 || Mount Lemmon || Mount Lemmon Survey || — || align=right data-sort-value="0.98" | 980 m || 
|-id=245 bgcolor=#fefefe
| 439245 ||  || — || April 19, 2004 || Kitt Peak || Spacewatch || — || align=right data-sort-value="0.68" | 680 m || 
|-id=246 bgcolor=#d6d6d6
| 439246 ||  || — || April 6, 2005 || Kitt Peak || Spacewatch || — || align=right | 2.2 km || 
|-id=247 bgcolor=#E9E9E9
| 439247 ||  || — || September 29, 2008 || Mount Lemmon || Mount Lemmon Survey || — || align=right | 1.7 km || 
|-id=248 bgcolor=#fefefe
| 439248 ||  || — || June 5, 2002 || Kitt Peak || Spacewatch || — || align=right data-sort-value="0.56" | 560 m || 
|-id=249 bgcolor=#E9E9E9
| 439249 ||  || — || September 29, 2008 || Kitt Peak || Spacewatch || MAR || align=right data-sort-value="0.88" | 880 m || 
|-id=250 bgcolor=#E9E9E9
| 439250 ||  || — || November 21, 2008 || Kitt Peak || Spacewatch || — || align=right | 1.8 km || 
|-id=251 bgcolor=#E9E9E9
| 439251 ||  || — || November 22, 2008 || Kitt Peak || Spacewatch || — || align=right | 1.4 km || 
|-id=252 bgcolor=#E9E9E9
| 439252 ||  || — || October 17, 2003 || Kitt Peak || Spacewatch || — || align=right | 1.9 km || 
|-id=253 bgcolor=#E9E9E9
| 439253 ||  || — || April 15, 2010 || Mount Lemmon || Mount Lemmon Survey || — || align=right | 1.5 km || 
|-id=254 bgcolor=#fefefe
| 439254 ||  || — || April 29, 2008 || Mount Lemmon || Mount Lemmon Survey || — || align=right data-sort-value="0.75" | 750 m || 
|-id=255 bgcolor=#E9E9E9
| 439255 ||  || — || November 10, 2004 || Kitt Peak || Spacewatch || (5) || align=right data-sort-value="0.71" | 710 m || 
|-id=256 bgcolor=#fefefe
| 439256 ||  || — || December 1, 2005 || Kitt Peak || Spacewatch || — || align=right data-sort-value="0.88" | 880 m || 
|-id=257 bgcolor=#E9E9E9
| 439257 ||  || — || April 7, 2006 || Catalina || CSS || — || align=right | 2.2 km || 
|-id=258 bgcolor=#E9E9E9
| 439258 ||  || — || September 17, 2012 || Kitt Peak || Spacewatch || — || align=right | 1.0 km || 
|-id=259 bgcolor=#fefefe
| 439259 ||  || — || April 8, 2008 || Kitt Peak || Spacewatch || — || align=right data-sort-value="0.71" | 710 m || 
|-id=260 bgcolor=#E9E9E9
| 439260 ||  || — || October 18, 2003 || Kitt Peak || Spacewatch || — || align=right | 3.1 km || 
|-id=261 bgcolor=#fefefe
| 439261 ||  || — || January 23, 2006 || Mount Lemmon || Mount Lemmon Survey || — || align=right data-sort-value="0.94" | 940 m || 
|-id=262 bgcolor=#E9E9E9
| 439262 ||  || — || March 16, 2010 || Mount Lemmon || Mount Lemmon Survey || RAF || align=right | 1.2 km || 
|-id=263 bgcolor=#E9E9E9
| 439263 ||  || — || June 15, 2010 || WISE || WISE || — || align=right | 2.5 km || 
|-id=264 bgcolor=#fefefe
| 439264 ||  || — || January 27, 2006 || Mount Lemmon || Mount Lemmon Survey || MAS || align=right data-sort-value="0.75" | 750 m || 
|-id=265 bgcolor=#fefefe
| 439265 ||  || — || May 8, 2005 || Kitt Peak || Spacewatch || — || align=right data-sort-value="0.65" | 650 m || 
|-id=266 bgcolor=#fefefe
| 439266 ||  || — || April 10, 2008 || Kitt Peak || Spacewatch || — || align=right data-sort-value="0.71" | 710 m || 
|-id=267 bgcolor=#E9E9E9
| 439267 ||  || — || October 27, 2008 || Mount Lemmon || Mount Lemmon Survey || — || align=right | 1.3 km || 
|-id=268 bgcolor=#fefefe
| 439268 ||  || — || May 4, 2005 || Mount Lemmon || Mount Lemmon Survey || — || align=right data-sort-value="0.59" | 590 m || 
|-id=269 bgcolor=#fefefe
| 439269 ||  || — || November 25, 2005 || Kitt Peak || Spacewatch || — || align=right data-sort-value="0.84" | 840 m || 
|-id=270 bgcolor=#E9E9E9
| 439270 ||  || — || April 12, 2010 || Mount Lemmon || Mount Lemmon Survey || — || align=right | 2.3 km || 
|-id=271 bgcolor=#fefefe
| 439271 ||  || — || November 11, 2009 || Kitt Peak || Spacewatch || — || align=right data-sort-value="0.70" | 700 m || 
|-id=272 bgcolor=#fefefe
| 439272 ||  || — || November 26, 2005 || Kitt Peak || Spacewatch || — || align=right data-sort-value="0.69" | 690 m || 
|-id=273 bgcolor=#fefefe
| 439273 ||  || — || September 14, 2012 || Catalina || CSS || — || align=right | 1.1 km || 
|-id=274 bgcolor=#fefefe
| 439274 ||  || — || November 20, 2001 || Kitt Peak || Spacewatch || — || align=right data-sort-value="0.84" | 840 m || 
|-id=275 bgcolor=#E9E9E9
| 439275 ||  || — || February 21, 2006 || Kitt Peak || Spacewatch || — || align=right | 1.3 km || 
|-id=276 bgcolor=#fefefe
| 439276 ||  || — || May 7, 2005 || Kitt Peak || Spacewatch || — || align=right data-sort-value="0.62" | 620 m || 
|-id=277 bgcolor=#fefefe
| 439277 ||  || — || September 23, 2008 || Mount Lemmon || Mount Lemmon Survey || — || align=right data-sort-value="0.83" | 830 m || 
|-id=278 bgcolor=#E9E9E9
| 439278 ||  || — || October 20, 2012 || Mount Lemmon || Mount Lemmon Survey || — || align=right | 1.4 km || 
|-id=279 bgcolor=#fefefe
| 439279 ||  || — || December 1, 2005 || Kitt Peak || Spacewatch || V || align=right data-sort-value="0.58" | 580 m || 
|-id=280 bgcolor=#E9E9E9
| 439280 ||  || — || October 20, 2012 || Kitt Peak || Spacewatch || (5) || align=right data-sort-value="0.85" | 850 m || 
|-id=281 bgcolor=#fefefe
| 439281 ||  || — || October 25, 2005 || Kitt Peak || Spacewatch || — || align=right data-sort-value="0.90" | 900 m || 
|-id=282 bgcolor=#fefefe
| 439282 ||  || — || October 6, 2005 || Mount Lemmon || Mount Lemmon Survey || — || align=right data-sort-value="0.69" | 690 m || 
|-id=283 bgcolor=#d6d6d6
| 439283 ||  || — || May 13, 2010 || WISE || WISE || — || align=right | 4.2 km || 
|-id=284 bgcolor=#fefefe
| 439284 ||  || — || April 24, 2011 || Mount Lemmon || Mount Lemmon Survey || — || align=right data-sort-value="0.89" | 890 m || 
|-id=285 bgcolor=#E9E9E9
| 439285 ||  || — || November 19, 2008 || Kitt Peak || Spacewatch || — || align=right | 1.2 km || 
|-id=286 bgcolor=#fefefe
| 439286 ||  || — || April 27, 2000 || Kitt Peak || Spacewatch || — || align=right data-sort-value="0.92" | 920 m || 
|-id=287 bgcolor=#E9E9E9
| 439287 ||  || — || February 16, 2010 || Kitt Peak || Spacewatch || MAR || align=right | 1.3 km || 
|-id=288 bgcolor=#E9E9E9
| 439288 ||  || — || October 7, 1999 || Socorro || LINEAR || — || align=right | 1.8 km || 
|-id=289 bgcolor=#E9E9E9
| 439289 ||  || — || March 4, 2006 || Catalina || CSS || ADE || align=right | 2.2 km || 
|-id=290 bgcolor=#d6d6d6
| 439290 ||  || — || October 10, 2012 || Mount Lemmon || Mount Lemmon Survey || — || align=right | 2.7 km || 
|-id=291 bgcolor=#fefefe
| 439291 ||  || — || September 28, 2009 || Kitt Peak || Spacewatch || — || align=right | 1.0 km || 
|-id=292 bgcolor=#E9E9E9
| 439292 ||  || — || December 5, 2008 || Mount Lemmon || Mount Lemmon Survey || — || align=right | 1.7 km || 
|-id=293 bgcolor=#fefefe
| 439293 ||  || — || May 28, 2008 || Mount Lemmon || Mount Lemmon Survey || — || align=right data-sort-value="0.70" | 700 m || 
|-id=294 bgcolor=#E9E9E9
| 439294 ||  || — || August 10, 2007 || Kitt Peak || Spacewatch || — || align=right | 1.9 km || 
|-id=295 bgcolor=#E9E9E9
| 439295 ||  || — || October 7, 2008 || Mount Lemmon || Mount Lemmon Survey || — || align=right | 2.6 km || 
|-id=296 bgcolor=#fefefe
| 439296 ||  || — || October 5, 2005 || Catalina || CSS || — || align=right data-sort-value="0.94" | 940 m || 
|-id=297 bgcolor=#fefefe
| 439297 ||  || — || March 15, 2007 || Mount Lemmon || Mount Lemmon Survey || — || align=right | 3.6 km || 
|-id=298 bgcolor=#E9E9E9
| 439298 ||  || — || June 7, 2010 || WISE || WISE || — || align=right | 5.7 km || 
|-id=299 bgcolor=#E9E9E9
| 439299 ||  || — || December 1, 2008 || Kitt Peak || Spacewatch || (5) || align=right data-sort-value="0.86" | 860 m || 
|-id=300 bgcolor=#E9E9E9
| 439300 ||  || — || December 22, 2008 || Kitt Peak || Spacewatch || — || align=right | 1.9 km || 
|}

439301–439400 

|-bgcolor=#fefefe
| 439301 ||  || — || September 4, 2008 || Kitt Peak || Spacewatch || SUL || align=right | 2.1 km || 
|-id=302 bgcolor=#E9E9E9
| 439302 ||  || — || January 23, 2006 || Kitt Peak || Spacewatch || — || align=right | 1.3 km || 
|-id=303 bgcolor=#E9E9E9
| 439303 ||  || — || March 18, 2010 || Mount Lemmon || Mount Lemmon Survey || — || align=right | 1.7 km || 
|-id=304 bgcolor=#E9E9E9
| 439304 ||  || — || October 10, 2007 || Catalina || CSS || GEF || align=right | 1.8 km || 
|-id=305 bgcolor=#d6d6d6
| 439305 ||  || — || November 5, 2007 || Kitt Peak || Spacewatch || — || align=right | 3.0 km || 
|-id=306 bgcolor=#E9E9E9
| 439306 ||  || — || September 23, 2008 || Kitt Peak || Spacewatch || — || align=right data-sort-value="0.99" | 990 m || 
|-id=307 bgcolor=#E9E9E9
| 439307 ||  || — || December 2, 2008 || Mount Lemmon || Mount Lemmon Survey || — || align=right | 2.0 km || 
|-id=308 bgcolor=#E9E9E9
| 439308 ||  || — || November 30, 2008 || Mount Lemmon || Mount Lemmon Survey || — || align=right data-sort-value="0.86" | 860 m || 
|-id=309 bgcolor=#fefefe
| 439309 ||  || — || May 28, 2008 || Mount Lemmon || Mount Lemmon Survey || — || align=right data-sort-value="0.75" | 750 m || 
|-id=310 bgcolor=#E9E9E9
| 439310 ||  || — || March 21, 2010 || Mount Lemmon || Mount Lemmon Survey || — || align=right | 2.1 km || 
|-id=311 bgcolor=#E9E9E9
| 439311 ||  || — || September 18, 2007 || Kitt Peak || Spacewatch || — || align=right | 1.7 km || 
|-id=312 bgcolor=#d6d6d6
| 439312 ||  || — || October 20, 2006 || Kitt Peak || Spacewatch || — || align=right | 3.1 km || 
|-id=313 bgcolor=#FFC2E0
| 439313 ||  || — || November 12, 2012 || Haleakala || Pan-STARRS || APOPHA || align=right data-sort-value="0.43" | 430 m || 
|-id=314 bgcolor=#fefefe
| 439314 ||  || — || April 14, 2007 || Kitt Peak || Spacewatch || — || align=right data-sort-value="0.88" | 880 m || 
|-id=315 bgcolor=#fefefe
| 439315 ||  || — || September 23, 2008 || Kitt Peak || Spacewatch || CLA || align=right | 1.5 km || 
|-id=316 bgcolor=#E9E9E9
| 439316 ||  || — || October 19, 2003 || Kitt Peak || Spacewatch || — || align=right | 1.7 km || 
|-id=317 bgcolor=#E9E9E9
| 439317 ||  || — || November 4, 2012 || Kitt Peak || Spacewatch || — || align=right | 2.7 km || 
|-id=318 bgcolor=#d6d6d6
| 439318 ||  || — || November 7, 2007 || Mount Lemmon || Mount Lemmon Survey || — || align=right | 3.0 km || 
|-id=319 bgcolor=#E9E9E9
| 439319 ||  || — || August 23, 2007 || Kitt Peak || Spacewatch || PAD || align=right | 1.4 km || 
|-id=320 bgcolor=#E9E9E9
| 439320 ||  || — || April 19, 2006 || Mount Lemmon || Mount Lemmon Survey || — || align=right | 1.5 km || 
|-id=321 bgcolor=#E9E9E9
| 439321 ||  || — || September 20, 2003 || Kitt Peak || Spacewatch || — || align=right | 1.3 km || 
|-id=322 bgcolor=#fefefe
| 439322 ||  || — || September 21, 2008 || Catalina || CSS || — || align=right data-sort-value="0.87" | 870 m || 
|-id=323 bgcolor=#d6d6d6
| 439323 ||  || — || January 12, 2008 || Mount Lemmon || Mount Lemmon Survey || — || align=right | 3.4 km || 
|-id=324 bgcolor=#fefefe
| 439324 ||  || — || November 1, 2008 || Mount Lemmon || Mount Lemmon Survey || — || align=right data-sort-value="0.98" | 980 m || 
|-id=325 bgcolor=#fefefe
| 439325 ||  || — || November 10, 2005 || Mount Lemmon || Mount Lemmon Survey || — || align=right data-sort-value="0.74" | 740 m || 
|-id=326 bgcolor=#fefefe
| 439326 ||  || — || April 15, 2007 || Kitt Peak || Spacewatch || — || align=right data-sort-value="0.79" | 790 m || 
|-id=327 bgcolor=#E9E9E9
| 439327 ||  || — || November 22, 2008 || Kitt Peak || Spacewatch || — || align=right | 1.2 km || 
|-id=328 bgcolor=#fefefe
| 439328 ||  || — || October 11, 2004 || Kitt Peak || Spacewatch || — || align=right data-sort-value="0.94" | 940 m || 
|-id=329 bgcolor=#E9E9E9
| 439329 ||  || — || November 19, 2003 || Kitt Peak || Spacewatch || — || align=right | 1.8 km || 
|-id=330 bgcolor=#E9E9E9
| 439330 ||  || — || November 22, 2012 || Kitt Peak || Spacewatch || GEF || align=right | 1.2 km || 
|-id=331 bgcolor=#d6d6d6
| 439331 ||  || — || October 23, 2006 || Catalina || CSS || — || align=right | 4.6 km || 
|-id=332 bgcolor=#E9E9E9
| 439332 ||  || — || November 30, 2003 || Kitt Peak || Spacewatch || — || align=right | 2.0 km || 
|-id=333 bgcolor=#d6d6d6
| 439333 ||  || — || November 3, 2007 || Kitt Peak || Spacewatch || EOS || align=right | 1.6 km || 
|-id=334 bgcolor=#fefefe
| 439334 ||  || — || December 25, 2005 || Mount Lemmon || Mount Lemmon Survey || — || align=right data-sort-value="0.81" | 810 m || 
|-id=335 bgcolor=#d6d6d6
| 439335 ||  || — || September 15, 2007 || Mount Lemmon || Mount Lemmon Survey || — || align=right | 2.6 km || 
|-id=336 bgcolor=#d6d6d6
| 439336 ||  || — || December 3, 2007 || Kitt Peak || Spacewatch || — || align=right | 3.3 km || 
|-id=337 bgcolor=#fefefe
| 439337 ||  || — || November 29, 2005 || Kitt Peak || Spacewatch || — || align=right data-sort-value="0.86" | 860 m || 
|-id=338 bgcolor=#d6d6d6
| 439338 ||  || — || November 16, 2001 || Kitt Peak || Spacewatch || — || align=right | 5.1 km || 
|-id=339 bgcolor=#d6d6d6
| 439339 ||  || — || October 23, 2012 || Mount Lemmon || Mount Lemmon Survey || — || align=right | 3.6 km || 
|-id=340 bgcolor=#E9E9E9
| 439340 ||  || — || October 28, 2008 || Mount Lemmon || Mount Lemmon Survey || — || align=right | 1.6 km || 
|-id=341 bgcolor=#d6d6d6
| 439341 ||  || — || January 30, 2008 || Mount Lemmon || Mount Lemmon Survey || — || align=right | 2.3 km || 
|-id=342 bgcolor=#fefefe
| 439342 ||  || — || September 19, 1973 || Palomar || PLS || — || align=right data-sort-value="0.81" | 810 m || 
|-id=343 bgcolor=#fefefe
| 439343 ||  || — || December 26, 2005 || Kitt Peak || Spacewatch || — || align=right data-sort-value="0.71" | 710 m || 
|-id=344 bgcolor=#E9E9E9
| 439344 ||  || — || May 30, 1997 || Kitt Peak || Spacewatch || GEF || align=right | 1.7 km || 
|-id=345 bgcolor=#E9E9E9
| 439345 ||  || — || November 7, 2012 || Kitt Peak || Spacewatch || EUN || align=right | 1.5 km || 
|-id=346 bgcolor=#d6d6d6
| 439346 ||  || — || December 4, 2007 || Mount Lemmon || Mount Lemmon Survey || — || align=right | 3.1 km || 
|-id=347 bgcolor=#fefefe
| 439347 ||  || — || October 7, 2008 || Mount Lemmon || Mount Lemmon Survey || — || align=right data-sort-value="0.83" | 830 m || 
|-id=348 bgcolor=#d6d6d6
| 439348 ||  || — || December 3, 2012 || Mount Lemmon || Mount Lemmon Survey || — || align=right | 2.5 km || 
|-id=349 bgcolor=#E9E9E9
| 439349 ||  || — || October 23, 2003 || Kitt Peak || Spacewatch || — || align=right | 2.5 km || 
|-id=350 bgcolor=#E9E9E9
| 439350 ||  || — || December 4, 2012 || Mount Lemmon || Mount Lemmon Survey || — || align=right | 2.1 km || 
|-id=351 bgcolor=#d6d6d6
| 439351 ||  || — || March 28, 2009 || Catalina || CSS || EOS || align=right | 2.3 km || 
|-id=352 bgcolor=#E9E9E9
| 439352 ||  || — || January 21, 2010 || WISE || WISE || — || align=right | 2.5 km || 
|-id=353 bgcolor=#E9E9E9
| 439353 ||  || — || June 6, 2011 || Mount Lemmon || Mount Lemmon Survey || — || align=right | 1.1 km || 
|-id=354 bgcolor=#E9E9E9
| 439354 ||  || — || March 16, 2010 || Mount Lemmon || Mount Lemmon Survey || — || align=right | 1.2 km || 
|-id=355 bgcolor=#d6d6d6
| 439355 ||  || — || October 19, 2006 || Mount Lemmon || Mount Lemmon Survey || — || align=right | 3.2 km || 
|-id=356 bgcolor=#E9E9E9
| 439356 ||  || — || March 16, 2010 || Catalina || CSS || — || align=right | 1.1 km || 
|-id=357 bgcolor=#E9E9E9
| 439357 ||  || — || June 5, 2011 || Mount Lemmon || Mount Lemmon Survey || — || align=right data-sort-value="0.97" | 970 m || 
|-id=358 bgcolor=#d6d6d6
| 439358 ||  || — || December 4, 2007 || Mount Lemmon || Mount Lemmon Survey || — || align=right | 2.9 km || 
|-id=359 bgcolor=#fefefe
| 439359 ||  || — || October 1, 2008 || Catalina || CSS || — || align=right data-sort-value="0.98" | 980 m || 
|-id=360 bgcolor=#d6d6d6
| 439360 ||  || — || November 25, 2012 || Kitt Peak || Spacewatch || EOS || align=right | 2.2 km || 
|-id=361 bgcolor=#fefefe
| 439361 ||  || — || December 28, 2005 || Kitt Peak || Spacewatch || — || align=right data-sort-value="0.75" | 750 m || 
|-id=362 bgcolor=#d6d6d6
| 439362 ||  || — || November 26, 2012 || Mount Lemmon || Mount Lemmon Survey || — || align=right | 3.0 km || 
|-id=363 bgcolor=#fefefe
| 439363 ||  || — || October 13, 2004 || Socorro || LINEAR || — || align=right | 1.0 km || 
|-id=364 bgcolor=#d6d6d6
| 439364 ||  || — || November 20, 2006 || Siding Spring || SSS || — || align=right | 4.2 km || 
|-id=365 bgcolor=#d6d6d6
| 439365 ||  || — || January 7, 2000 || Kitt Peak || Spacewatch || SYL7:4 || align=right | 5.5 km || 
|-id=366 bgcolor=#fefefe
| 439366 ||  || — || November 4, 2012 || Catalina || CSS || — || align=right | 2.7 km || 
|-id=367 bgcolor=#d6d6d6
| 439367 ||  || — || February 12, 2008 || Mount Lemmon || Mount Lemmon Survey || — || align=right | 2.7 km || 
|-id=368 bgcolor=#d6d6d6
| 439368 ||  || — || July 3, 2005 || Mount Lemmon || Mount Lemmon Survey || EOS || align=right | 2.0 km || 
|-id=369 bgcolor=#d6d6d6
| 439369 ||  || — || March 15, 2004 || Kitt Peak || Spacewatch || — || align=right | 2.4 km || 
|-id=370 bgcolor=#d6d6d6
| 439370 ||  || — || November 19, 2006 || Catalina || CSS || — || align=right | 3.4 km || 
|-id=371 bgcolor=#d6d6d6
| 439371 ||  || — || December 13, 2012 || Mount Lemmon || Mount Lemmon Survey || KOR || align=right | 1.4 km || 
|-id=372 bgcolor=#d6d6d6
| 439372 ||  || — || November 16, 2006 || Catalina || CSS || — || align=right | 3.0 km || 
|-id=373 bgcolor=#d6d6d6
| 439373 ||  || — || May 8, 2010 || WISE || WISE || — || align=right | 3.6 km || 
|-id=374 bgcolor=#E9E9E9
| 439374 ||  || — || November 26, 2012 || Mount Lemmon || Mount Lemmon Survey || — || align=right | 1.1 km || 
|-id=375 bgcolor=#d6d6d6
| 439375 ||  || — || November 25, 2006 || Mount Lemmon || Mount Lemmon Survey || — || align=right | 3.6 km || 
|-id=376 bgcolor=#d6d6d6
| 439376 ||  || — || April 12, 2008 || Catalina || CSS || — || align=right | 3.4 km || 
|-id=377 bgcolor=#d6d6d6
| 439377 ||  || — || September 13, 2005 || Kitt Peak || Spacewatch || EOS || align=right | 2.1 km || 
|-id=378 bgcolor=#E9E9E9
| 439378 ||  || — || October 19, 2007 || Catalina || CSS || (5) || align=right | 1.0 km || 
|-id=379 bgcolor=#E9E9E9
| 439379 ||  || — || February 16, 2004 || Kitt Peak || Spacewatch || — || align=right | 2.1 km || 
|-id=380 bgcolor=#fefefe
| 439380 ||  || — || March 12, 2002 || Kitt Peak || Spacewatch || — || align=right | 1.1 km || 
|-id=381 bgcolor=#E9E9E9
| 439381 ||  || — || October 9, 2007 || Kitt Peak || Spacewatch || WIT || align=right data-sort-value="0.96" | 960 m || 
|-id=382 bgcolor=#d6d6d6
| 439382 ||  || — || January 4, 2013 || Kitt Peak || Spacewatch || — || align=right | 2.8 km || 
|-id=383 bgcolor=#d6d6d6
| 439383 ||  || — || July 9, 2005 || Kitt Peak || Spacewatch || — || align=right | 2.8 km || 
|-id=384 bgcolor=#E9E9E9
| 439384 ||  || — || January 27, 2000 || Kitt Peak || Spacewatch || — || align=right | 1.9 km || 
|-id=385 bgcolor=#d6d6d6
| 439385 ||  || — || April 29, 2009 || Mount Lemmon || Mount Lemmon Survey || — || align=right | 3.1 km || 
|-id=386 bgcolor=#d6d6d6
| 439386 ||  || — || February 29, 2008 || Siding Spring || SSS || — || align=right | 5.2 km || 
|-id=387 bgcolor=#fefefe
| 439387 ||  || — || January 9, 2002 || Socorro || LINEAR || — || align=right data-sort-value="0.93" | 930 m || 
|-id=388 bgcolor=#d6d6d6
| 439388 ||  || — || February 8, 2008 || Catalina || CSS || — || align=right | 4.1 km || 
|-id=389 bgcolor=#d6d6d6
| 439389 ||  || — || March 1, 2008 || Mount Lemmon || Mount Lemmon Survey || — || align=right | 3.2 km || 
|-id=390 bgcolor=#fefefe
| 439390 ||  || — || February 25, 2006 || Kitt Peak || Spacewatch || V || align=right data-sort-value="0.74" | 740 m || 
|-id=391 bgcolor=#E9E9E9
| 439391 ||  || — || August 31, 2011 || Siding Spring || SSS || — || align=right | 2.6 km || 
|-id=392 bgcolor=#E9E9E9
| 439392 ||  || — || November 21, 2007 || Mount Lemmon || Mount Lemmon Survey || — || align=right | 2.2 km || 
|-id=393 bgcolor=#E9E9E9
| 439393 ||  || — || November 1, 2007 || Kitt Peak || Spacewatch || — || align=right | 2.0 km || 
|-id=394 bgcolor=#d6d6d6
| 439394 ||  || — || November 12, 2007 || Mount Lemmon || Mount Lemmon Survey || — || align=right | 3.6 km || 
|-id=395 bgcolor=#C2FFFF
| 439395 ||  || — || September 30, 1997 || Kitt Peak || Spacewatch || L4 || align=right | 7.4 km || 
|-id=396 bgcolor=#d6d6d6
| 439396 ||  || — || October 17, 2011 || Kitt Peak || Spacewatch || — || align=right | 2.7 km || 
|-id=397 bgcolor=#d6d6d6
| 439397 ||  || — || February 8, 2008 || Kitt Peak || Spacewatch || — || align=right | 2.1 km || 
|-id=398 bgcolor=#d6d6d6
| 439398 ||  || — || September 26, 2006 || Mount Lemmon || Mount Lemmon Survey || — || align=right | 1.9 km || 
|-id=399 bgcolor=#d6d6d6
| 439399 ||  || — || December 5, 2007 || Catalina || CSS || — || align=right | 5.1 km || 
|-id=400 bgcolor=#E9E9E9
| 439400 ||  || — || December 17, 2003 || Kitt Peak || Spacewatch || — || align=right | 1.8 km || 
|}

439401–439500 

|-bgcolor=#d6d6d6
| 439401 ||  || — || December 16, 2006 || Kitt Peak || Spacewatch || — || align=right | 3.4 km || 
|-id=402 bgcolor=#C2FFFF
| 439402 ||  || — || December 8, 2010 || Catalina || CSS || L4 || align=right | 10 km || 
|-id=403 bgcolor=#d6d6d6
| 439403 ||  || — || December 2, 2005 || Mount Lemmon || Mount Lemmon Survey || 7:4 || align=right | 4.1 km || 
|-id=404 bgcolor=#d6d6d6
| 439404 ||  || — || December 31, 2007 || Mount Lemmon || Mount Lemmon Survey || — || align=right | 2.7 km || 
|-id=405 bgcolor=#d6d6d6
| 439405 ||  || — || January 20, 2013 || Kitt Peak || Spacewatch || KOR || align=right | 1.3 km || 
|-id=406 bgcolor=#d6d6d6
| 439406 ||  || — || September 24, 2006 || Kitt Peak || Spacewatch || KOR || align=right | 1.3 km || 
|-id=407 bgcolor=#E9E9E9
| 439407 ||  || — || October 19, 2007 || Catalina || CSS || — || align=right | 1.2 km || 
|-id=408 bgcolor=#d6d6d6
| 439408 ||  || — || February 1, 2013 || Kitt Peak || Spacewatch || — || align=right | 3.7 km || 
|-id=409 bgcolor=#d6d6d6
| 439409 ||  || — || December 31, 2007 || Mount Lemmon || Mount Lemmon Survey || — || align=right | 2.4 km || 
|-id=410 bgcolor=#d6d6d6
| 439410 ||  || — || February 18, 2008 || Mount Lemmon || Mount Lemmon Survey || — || align=right | 3.4 km || 
|-id=411 bgcolor=#d6d6d6
| 439411 ||  || — || January 19, 2013 || Kitt Peak || Spacewatch || — || align=right | 3.1 km || 
|-id=412 bgcolor=#d6d6d6
| 439412 ||  || — || March 11, 2008 || Mount Lemmon || Mount Lemmon Survey || — || align=right | 3.7 km || 
|-id=413 bgcolor=#d6d6d6
| 439413 ||  || — || February 28, 2008 || Kitt Peak || Spacewatch || — || align=right | 3.1 km || 
|-id=414 bgcolor=#d6d6d6
| 439414 ||  || — || February 28, 2008 || Kitt Peak || Spacewatch || — || align=right | 3.0 km || 
|-id=415 bgcolor=#d6d6d6
| 439415 ||  || — || August 25, 2004 || Kitt Peak || Spacewatch || — || align=right | 3.1 km || 
|-id=416 bgcolor=#E9E9E9
| 439416 ||  || — || April 2, 2009 || Mount Lemmon || Mount Lemmon Survey || — || align=right | 2.3 km || 
|-id=417 bgcolor=#E9E9E9
| 439417 ||  || — || February 4, 2000 || Kitt Peak || Spacewatch || — || align=right | 1.2 km || 
|-id=418 bgcolor=#d6d6d6
| 439418 ||  || — || February 29, 2008 || Kitt Peak || Spacewatch || — || align=right | 3.0 km || 
|-id=419 bgcolor=#d6d6d6
| 439419 ||  || — || January 20, 2013 || Kitt Peak || Spacewatch || — || align=right | 3.1 km || 
|-id=420 bgcolor=#d6d6d6
| 439420 ||  || — || February 14, 2013 || Kitt Peak || Spacewatch || — || align=right | 2.8 km || 
|-id=421 bgcolor=#d6d6d6
| 439421 ||  || — || January 11, 2008 || Mount Lemmon || Mount Lemmon Survey || — || align=right | 2.2 km || 
|-id=422 bgcolor=#d6d6d6
| 439422 ||  || — || October 22, 2005 || Kitt Peak || Spacewatch || — || align=right | 3.8 km || 
|-id=423 bgcolor=#d6d6d6
| 439423 ||  || — || October 1, 2005 || Anderson Mesa || LONEOS || — || align=right | 4.3 km || 
|-id=424 bgcolor=#E9E9E9
| 439424 ||  || — || August 18, 2006 || Kitt Peak || Spacewatch || WIT || align=right | 1.2 km || 
|-id=425 bgcolor=#d6d6d6
| 439425 ||  || — || October 28, 2005 || Kitt Peak || Spacewatch || — || align=right | 2.4 km || 
|-id=426 bgcolor=#d6d6d6
| 439426 ||  || — || March 9, 2007 || Mount Lemmon || Mount Lemmon Survey || — || align=right | 4.6 km || 
|-id=427 bgcolor=#d6d6d6
| 439427 ||  || — || September 26, 2005 || Kitt Peak || Spacewatch || KOR || align=right | 1.8 km || 
|-id=428 bgcolor=#d6d6d6
| 439428 ||  || — || July 18, 2010 || WISE || WISE || 7:4 || align=right | 3.0 km || 
|-id=429 bgcolor=#d6d6d6
| 439429 ||  || — || September 17, 2004 || Kitt Peak || Spacewatch || — || align=right | 3.4 km || 
|-id=430 bgcolor=#d6d6d6
| 439430 ||  || — || October 5, 2004 || Kitt Peak || Spacewatch || — || align=right | 2.9 km || 
|-id=431 bgcolor=#d6d6d6
| 439431 ||  || — || March 31, 2008 || Mount Lemmon || Mount Lemmon Survey || — || align=right | 4.2 km || 
|-id=432 bgcolor=#d6d6d6
| 439432 ||  || — || February 6, 1995 || Kitt Peak || Spacewatch || — || align=right | 4.6 km || 
|-id=433 bgcolor=#d6d6d6
| 439433 ||  || — || February 17, 2007 || Catalina || CSS || — || align=right | 3.1 km || 
|-id=434 bgcolor=#E9E9E9
| 439434 ||  || — || May 8, 2005 || Kitt Peak || Spacewatch || (5) || align=right data-sort-value="0.92" | 920 m || 
|-id=435 bgcolor=#d6d6d6
| 439435 ||  || — || December 27, 2005 || Kitt Peak || Spacewatch || — || align=right | 3.9 km || 
|-id=436 bgcolor=#d6d6d6
| 439436 ||  || — || January 7, 2006 || Mount Lemmon || Mount Lemmon Survey || — || align=right | 4.0 km || 
|-id=437 bgcolor=#FFC2E0
| 439437 ||  || — || July 1, 2013 || Siding Spring || SSS || APOPHAcritical || align=right data-sort-value="0.65" | 650 m || 
|-id=438 bgcolor=#fefefe
| 439438 ||  || — || December 30, 2008 || Catalina || CSS || H || align=right data-sort-value="0.80" | 800 m || 
|-id=439 bgcolor=#FA8072
| 439439 ||  || — || April 20, 2010 || Mount Lemmon || Mount Lemmon Survey || H || align=right data-sort-value="0.45" | 450 m || 
|-id=440 bgcolor=#fefefe
| 439440 ||  || — || June 6, 2002 || Socorro || LINEAR || H || align=right data-sort-value="0.87" | 870 m || 
|-id=441 bgcolor=#fefefe
| 439441 ||  || — || January 2, 2009 || Catalina || CSS || H || align=right data-sort-value="0.60" | 600 m || 
|-id=442 bgcolor=#E9E9E9
| 439442 ||  || — || September 15, 2013 || Mount Lemmon || Mount Lemmon Survey || — || align=right | 3.1 km || 
|-id=443 bgcolor=#E9E9E9
| 439443 ||  || — || November 21, 2000 || Socorro || LINEAR || — || align=right | 2.0 km || 
|-id=444 bgcolor=#fefefe
| 439444 ||  || — || December 22, 2008 || Kitt Peak || Spacewatch || H || align=right data-sort-value="0.87" | 870 m || 
|-id=445 bgcolor=#E9E9E9
| 439445 ||  || — || March 26, 2010 || WISE || WISE || — || align=right | 3.7 km || 
|-id=446 bgcolor=#d6d6d6
| 439446 ||  || — || January 30, 2009 || Catalina || CSS || — || align=right | 2.7 km || 
|-id=447 bgcolor=#fefefe
| 439447 ||  || — || October 1, 2006 || Kitt Peak || Spacewatch || — || align=right data-sort-value="0.67" | 670 m || 
|-id=448 bgcolor=#fefefe
| 439448 ||  || — || April 16, 2004 || Kitt Peak || Spacewatch || — || align=right data-sort-value="0.77" | 770 m || 
|-id=449 bgcolor=#E9E9E9
| 439449 ||  || — || September 24, 2009 || Mount Lemmon || Mount Lemmon Survey || — || align=right | 1.5 km || 
|-id=450 bgcolor=#E9E9E9
| 439450 ||  || — || December 13, 2013 || Mount Lemmon || Mount Lemmon Survey || — || align=right | 1.7 km || 
|-id=451 bgcolor=#fefefe
| 439451 ||  || — || October 21, 2006 || Mount Lemmon || Mount Lemmon Survey || — || align=right data-sort-value="0.77" | 770 m || 
|-id=452 bgcolor=#E9E9E9
| 439452 ||  || — || December 30, 2000 || Socorro || LINEAR || — || align=right | 2.4 km || 
|-id=453 bgcolor=#d6d6d6
| 439453 ||  || — || December 4, 2008 || Mount Lemmon || Mount Lemmon Survey || — || align=right | 2.4 km || 
|-id=454 bgcolor=#E9E9E9
| 439454 ||  || — || February 9, 2005 || Mount Lemmon || Mount Lemmon Survey || — || align=right | 2.1 km || 
|-id=455 bgcolor=#fefefe
| 439455 ||  || — || October 21, 2009 || Mount Lemmon || Mount Lemmon Survey || — || align=right data-sort-value="0.69" | 690 m || 
|-id=456 bgcolor=#E9E9E9
| 439456 ||  || — || December 25, 2013 || Kitt Peak || Spacewatch || — || align=right | 1.3 km || 
|-id=457 bgcolor=#fefefe
| 439457 ||  || — || February 22, 2007 || Kitt Peak || Spacewatch || — || align=right data-sort-value="0.73" | 730 m || 
|-id=458 bgcolor=#fefefe
| 439458 ||  || — || January 6, 2002 || Anderson Mesa || LONEOS || — || align=right | 1.7 km || 
|-id=459 bgcolor=#E9E9E9
| 439459 ||  || — || April 2, 2006 || Kitt Peak || Spacewatch || — || align=right | 1.4 km || 
|-id=460 bgcolor=#E9E9E9
| 439460 ||  || — || January 23, 2006 || Catalina || CSS || MAR || align=right | 1.3 km || 
|-id=461 bgcolor=#E9E9E9
| 439461 ||  || — || April 17, 2007 || Catalina || CSS || — || align=right | 1.8 km || 
|-id=462 bgcolor=#d6d6d6
| 439462 ||  || — || January 15, 2010 || WISE || WISE || BRA || align=right | 2.4 km || 
|-id=463 bgcolor=#fefefe
| 439463 ||  || — || October 12, 2009 || Mount Lemmon || Mount Lemmon Survey || — || align=right data-sort-value="0.79" | 790 m || 
|-id=464 bgcolor=#fefefe
| 439464 ||  || — || January 4, 2010 || Kitt Peak || Spacewatch || — || align=right data-sort-value="0.97" | 970 m || 
|-id=465 bgcolor=#d6d6d6
| 439465 ||  || — || December 29, 2008 || Mount Lemmon || Mount Lemmon Survey || — || align=right | 2.9 km || 
|-id=466 bgcolor=#fefefe
| 439466 ||  || — || July 28, 2008 || Catalina || CSS || — || align=right | 1.9 km || 
|-id=467 bgcolor=#E9E9E9
| 439467 ||  || — || August 12, 2012 || Kitt Peak || Spacewatch || — || align=right | 2.1 km || 
|-id=468 bgcolor=#E9E9E9
| 439468 ||  || — || December 20, 2009 || Mount Lemmon || Mount Lemmon Survey || — || align=right | 1.1 km || 
|-id=469 bgcolor=#fefefe
| 439469 ||  || — || November 18, 2009 || Kitt Peak || Spacewatch || V || align=right data-sort-value="0.74" | 740 m || 
|-id=470 bgcolor=#E9E9E9
| 439470 ||  || — || October 1, 2003 || Kitt Peak || Spacewatch || — || align=right | 2.0 km || 
|-id=471 bgcolor=#fefefe
| 439471 ||  || — || November 18, 2006 || Mount Lemmon || Mount Lemmon Survey || — || align=right data-sort-value="0.73" | 730 m || 
|-id=472 bgcolor=#E9E9E9
| 439472 ||  || — || October 26, 2009 || Mount Lemmon || Mount Lemmon Survey || — || align=right | 1.4 km || 
|-id=473 bgcolor=#E9E9E9
| 439473 ||  || — || October 20, 2008 || Kitt Peak || Spacewatch || — || align=right | 2.0 km || 
|-id=474 bgcolor=#fefefe
| 439474 ||  || — || October 15, 2012 || Mount Lemmon || Mount Lemmon Survey || — || align=right | 1.0 km || 
|-id=475 bgcolor=#d6d6d6
| 439475 ||  || — || October 31, 2013 || Mount Lemmon || Mount Lemmon Survey || — || align=right | 3.5 km || 
|-id=476 bgcolor=#fefefe
| 439476 ||  || — || March 11, 2007 || Mount Lemmon || Mount Lemmon Survey || — || align=right data-sort-value="0.83" | 830 m || 
|-id=477 bgcolor=#fefefe
| 439477 ||  || — || May 23, 2011 || Mount Lemmon || Mount Lemmon Survey || — || align=right data-sort-value="0.86" | 860 m || 
|-id=478 bgcolor=#E9E9E9
| 439478 ||  || — || November 4, 2004 || Kitt Peak || Spacewatch || — || align=right | 1.5 km || 
|-id=479 bgcolor=#fefefe
| 439479 ||  || — || November 22, 2006 || Mount Lemmon || Mount Lemmon Survey || — || align=right data-sort-value="0.91" | 910 m || 
|-id=480 bgcolor=#fefefe
| 439480 ||  || — || October 6, 2000 || Kitt Peak || Spacewatch || — || align=right data-sort-value="0.78" | 780 m || 
|-id=481 bgcolor=#fefefe
| 439481 ||  || — || November 17, 2009 || Mount Lemmon || Mount Lemmon Survey || — || align=right data-sort-value="0.87" | 870 m || 
|-id=482 bgcolor=#d6d6d6
| 439482 ||  || — || November 9, 2007 || Mount Lemmon || Mount Lemmon Survey || — || align=right | 2.9 km || 
|-id=483 bgcolor=#fefefe
| 439483 ||  || — || September 17, 2010 || Socorro || LINEAR || H || align=right data-sort-value="0.77" | 770 m || 
|-id=484 bgcolor=#E9E9E9
| 439484 ||  || — || January 6, 2005 || Socorro || LINEAR || — || align=right | 2.0 km || 
|-id=485 bgcolor=#d6d6d6
| 439485 ||  || — || December 22, 2008 || Kitt Peak || Spacewatch || — || align=right | 2.3 km || 
|-id=486 bgcolor=#fefefe
| 439486 ||  || — || September 27, 2006 || Kitt Peak || Spacewatch || — || align=right data-sort-value="0.55" | 550 m || 
|-id=487 bgcolor=#fefefe
| 439487 ||  || — || August 18, 2006 || Kitt Peak || Spacewatch || — || align=right data-sort-value="0.62" | 620 m || 
|-id=488 bgcolor=#E9E9E9
| 439488 ||  || — || January 28, 2006 || Kitt Peak || Spacewatch || — || align=right data-sort-value="0.86" | 860 m || 
|-id=489 bgcolor=#E9E9E9
| 439489 ||  || — || June 9, 2011 || Mount Lemmon || Mount Lemmon Survey || — || align=right | 1.1 km || 
|-id=490 bgcolor=#E9E9E9
| 439490 ||  || — || September 27, 2008 || Mount Lemmon || Mount Lemmon Survey || — || align=right data-sort-value="0.88" | 880 m || 
|-id=491 bgcolor=#E9E9E9
| 439491 ||  || — || October 28, 2008 || Mount Lemmon || Mount Lemmon Survey || — || align=right | 2.6 km || 
|-id=492 bgcolor=#fefefe
| 439492 ||  || — || December 27, 2006 || Mount Lemmon || Mount Lemmon Survey || NYS || align=right data-sort-value="0.72" | 720 m || 
|-id=493 bgcolor=#E9E9E9
| 439493 ||  || — || December 20, 2009 || Kitt Peak || Spacewatch || — || align=right | 1.0 km || 
|-id=494 bgcolor=#fefefe
| 439494 ||  || — || February 22, 2003 || Anderson Mesa || LONEOS || NYS || align=right data-sort-value="0.63" | 630 m || 
|-id=495 bgcolor=#E9E9E9
| 439495 ||  || — || April 11, 2010 || WISE || WISE || — || align=right data-sort-value="0.99" | 990 m || 
|-id=496 bgcolor=#fefefe
| 439496 ||  || — || September 26, 2006 || Socorro || LINEAR || — || align=right data-sort-value="0.73" | 730 m || 
|-id=497 bgcolor=#E9E9E9
| 439497 ||  || — || April 25, 2006 || Kitt Peak || Spacewatch || — || align=right | 1.7 km || 
|-id=498 bgcolor=#d6d6d6
| 439498 ||  || — || August 29, 2006 || Kitt Peak || Spacewatch || — || align=right | 2.7 km || 
|-id=499 bgcolor=#d6d6d6
| 439499 ||  || — || October 19, 2012 || Mount Lemmon || Mount Lemmon Survey || — || align=right | 3.1 km || 
|-id=500 bgcolor=#fefefe
| 439500 ||  || — || March 27, 2008 || Kitt Peak || Spacewatch || — || align=right data-sort-value="0.76" | 760 m || 
|}

439501–439600 

|-bgcolor=#E9E9E9
| 439501 ||  || — || October 26, 2008 || Mount Lemmon || Mount Lemmon Survey || — || align=right | 1.7 km || 
|-id=502 bgcolor=#E9E9E9
| 439502 ||  || — || January 21, 2006 || Siding Spring || SSS || — || align=right | 2.3 km || 
|-id=503 bgcolor=#E9E9E9
| 439503 ||  || — || January 17, 2005 || Socorro || LINEAR || NEM || align=right | 2.5 km || 
|-id=504 bgcolor=#E9E9E9
| 439504 ||  || — || December 20, 2004 || Mount Lemmon || Mount Lemmon Survey || — || align=right | 1.8 km || 
|-id=505 bgcolor=#fefefe
| 439505 ||  || — || January 4, 2010 || Kitt Peak || Spacewatch || MAS || align=right data-sort-value="0.68" | 680 m || 
|-id=506 bgcolor=#fefefe
| 439506 ||  || — || April 2, 2011 || Kitt Peak || Spacewatch || V || align=right data-sort-value="0.69" | 690 m || 
|-id=507 bgcolor=#d6d6d6
| 439507 ||  || — || November 8, 2007 || Mount Lemmon || Mount Lemmon Survey || — || align=right | 3.1 km || 
|-id=508 bgcolor=#d6d6d6
| 439508 ||  || — || December 18, 2003 || Kitt Peak || Spacewatch || — || align=right | 2.8 km || 
|-id=509 bgcolor=#fefefe
| 439509 ||  || — || July 29, 2008 || Mount Lemmon || Mount Lemmon Survey || V || align=right data-sort-value="0.85" | 850 m || 
|-id=510 bgcolor=#fefefe
| 439510 ||  || — || January 27, 2007 || Mount Lemmon || Mount Lemmon Survey || — || align=right data-sort-value="0.76" | 760 m || 
|-id=511 bgcolor=#d6d6d6
| 439511 ||  || — || March 30, 2004 || Kitt Peak || Spacewatch || VER || align=right | 2.7 km || 
|-id=512 bgcolor=#fefefe
| 439512 ||  || — || August 25, 2012 || Kitt Peak || Spacewatch || — || align=right data-sort-value="0.76" | 760 m || 
|-id=513 bgcolor=#E9E9E9
| 439513 ||  || — || November 20, 2008 || Mount Lemmon || Mount Lemmon Survey || — || align=right | 1.6 km || 
|-id=514 bgcolor=#fefefe
| 439514 ||  || — || September 23, 2008 || Mount Lemmon || Mount Lemmon Survey || — || align=right data-sort-value="0.97" | 970 m || 
|-id=515 bgcolor=#d6d6d6
| 439515 ||  || — || December 30, 2008 || Mount Lemmon || Mount Lemmon Survey || — || align=right | 2.5 km || 
|-id=516 bgcolor=#E9E9E9
| 439516 ||  || — || October 11, 2007 || Kitt Peak || Spacewatch || — || align=right | 1.6 km || 
|-id=517 bgcolor=#fefefe
| 439517 ||  || — || February 8, 2007 || Mount Lemmon || Mount Lemmon Survey || — || align=right data-sort-value="0.78" | 780 m || 
|-id=518 bgcolor=#E9E9E9
| 439518 ||  || — || December 19, 2009 || Mount Lemmon || Mount Lemmon Survey || — || align=right data-sort-value="0.94" | 940 m || 
|-id=519 bgcolor=#fefefe
| 439519 ||  || — || September 6, 2008 || Mount Lemmon || Mount Lemmon Survey || V || align=right data-sort-value="0.68" | 680 m || 
|-id=520 bgcolor=#E9E9E9
| 439520 ||  || — || January 16, 2005 || Kitt Peak || Spacewatch || NEM || align=right | 2.2 km || 
|-id=521 bgcolor=#E9E9E9
| 439521 ||  || — || December 20, 2004 || Mount Lemmon || Mount Lemmon Survey || — || align=right | 3.0 km || 
|-id=522 bgcolor=#E9E9E9
| 439522 ||  || — || January 17, 2005 || Kitt Peak || Spacewatch || — || align=right | 2.1 km || 
|-id=523 bgcolor=#E9E9E9
| 439523 ||  || — || April 6, 2010 || Catalina || CSS || — || align=right | 3.5 km || 
|-id=524 bgcolor=#E9E9E9
| 439524 ||  || — || May 7, 2010 || WISE || WISE || — || align=right | 2.2 km || 
|-id=525 bgcolor=#fefefe
| 439525 ||  || — || December 25, 2005 || Kitt Peak || Spacewatch || — || align=right data-sort-value="0.84" | 840 m || 
|-id=526 bgcolor=#fefefe
| 439526 ||  || — || January 5, 2000 || Socorro || LINEAR || H || align=right data-sort-value="0.93" | 930 m || 
|-id=527 bgcolor=#E9E9E9
| 439527 ||  || — || September 23, 2008 || Catalina || CSS || EUN || align=right | 1.7 km || 
|-id=528 bgcolor=#E9E9E9
| 439528 ||  || — || March 9, 2006 || Kitt Peak || Spacewatch || — || align=right | 1.0 km || 
|-id=529 bgcolor=#E9E9E9
| 439529 ||  || — || August 23, 2007 || Siding Spring || SSS || — || align=right | 2.5 km || 
|-id=530 bgcolor=#E9E9E9
| 439530 ||  || — || December 25, 2005 || Kitt Peak || Spacewatch || — || align=right | 2.3 km || 
|-id=531 bgcolor=#fefefe
| 439531 ||  || — || September 12, 2004 || Kitt Peak || Spacewatch || — || align=right | 1.1 km || 
|-id=532 bgcolor=#E9E9E9
| 439532 ||  || — || February 2, 2005 || Kitt Peak || Spacewatch || — || align=right | 3.1 km || 
|-id=533 bgcolor=#d6d6d6
| 439533 ||  || — || March 18, 2004 || Kitt Peak || Spacewatch || — || align=right | 2.3 km || 
|-id=534 bgcolor=#fefefe
| 439534 ||  || — || January 6, 2010 || Kitt Peak || Spacewatch || NYS || align=right data-sort-value="0.66" | 660 m || 
|-id=535 bgcolor=#E9E9E9
| 439535 ||  || — || September 4, 2007 || Mount Lemmon || Mount Lemmon Survey || — || align=right | 1.2 km || 
|-id=536 bgcolor=#fefefe
| 439536 ||  || — || February 23, 2007 || Mount Lemmon || Mount Lemmon Survey || V || align=right data-sort-value="0.48" | 480 m || 
|-id=537 bgcolor=#fefefe
| 439537 ||  || — || March 25, 2006 || Kitt Peak || Spacewatch || H || align=right | 1.0 km || 
|-id=538 bgcolor=#E9E9E9
| 439538 ||  || — || June 25, 2011 || Mount Lemmon || Mount Lemmon Survey || MAR || align=right | 1.3 km || 
|-id=539 bgcolor=#E9E9E9
| 439539 ||  || — || March 23, 2006 || Kitt Peak || Spacewatch || — || align=right | 1.7 km || 
|-id=540 bgcolor=#E9E9E9
| 439540 ||  || — || June 27, 1998 || Kitt Peak || Spacewatch || EUN || align=right | 1.3 km || 
|-id=541 bgcolor=#d6d6d6
| 439541 ||  || — || April 12, 2010 || Mount Lemmon || Mount Lemmon Survey || BRA || align=right | 1.3 km || 
|-id=542 bgcolor=#fefefe
| 439542 ||  || — || October 25, 2005 || Mount Lemmon || Mount Lemmon Survey || MAS || align=right data-sort-value="0.80" | 800 m || 
|-id=543 bgcolor=#fefefe
| 439543 ||  || — || September 30, 2005 || Mount Lemmon || Mount Lemmon Survey || — || align=right data-sort-value="0.87" | 870 m || 
|-id=544 bgcolor=#E9E9E9
| 439544 ||  || — || December 11, 2004 || Kitt Peak || Spacewatch || — || align=right | 2.4 km || 
|-id=545 bgcolor=#E9E9E9
| 439545 ||  || — || October 25, 2012 || Mount Lemmon || Mount Lemmon Survey || — || align=right | 2.0 km || 
|-id=546 bgcolor=#d6d6d6
| 439546 ||  || — || June 18, 2005 || Mount Lemmon || Mount Lemmon Survey || — || align=right | 3.4 km || 
|-id=547 bgcolor=#d6d6d6
| 439547 ||  || — || January 18, 2008 || Kitt Peak || Spacewatch || — || align=right | 4.9 km || 
|-id=548 bgcolor=#fefefe
| 439548 ||  || — || October 25, 2005 || Kitt Peak || Spacewatch || NYS || align=right data-sort-value="0.58" | 580 m || 
|-id=549 bgcolor=#E9E9E9
| 439549 ||  || — || April 12, 2010 || Mount Lemmon || Mount Lemmon Survey || — || align=right | 1.9 km || 
|-id=550 bgcolor=#fefefe
| 439550 ||  || — || January 12, 2010 || Mount Lemmon || Mount Lemmon Survey || — || align=right data-sort-value="0.83" | 830 m || 
|-id=551 bgcolor=#fefefe
| 439551 ||  || — || January 11, 2003 || Kitt Peak || Spacewatch || — || align=right data-sort-value="0.75" | 750 m || 
|-id=552 bgcolor=#d6d6d6
| 439552 ||  || — || March 7, 2003 || Anderson Mesa || LONEOS || — || align=right | 5.0 km || 
|-id=553 bgcolor=#fefefe
| 439553 ||  || — || February 29, 2004 || Kitt Peak || Spacewatch || — || align=right data-sort-value="0.71" | 710 m || 
|-id=554 bgcolor=#d6d6d6
| 439554 ||  || — || June 18, 2005 || Mount Lemmon || Mount Lemmon Survey || — || align=right | 3.1 km || 
|-id=555 bgcolor=#d6d6d6
| 439555 ||  || — || December 3, 2007 || Kitt Peak || Spacewatch || THM || align=right | 2.4 km || 
|-id=556 bgcolor=#d6d6d6
| 439556 ||  || — || July 9, 2005 || Kitt Peak || Spacewatch || — || align=right | 3.1 km || 
|-id=557 bgcolor=#d6d6d6
| 439557 ||  || — || November 11, 2007 || Mount Lemmon || Mount Lemmon Survey || — || align=right | 3.0 km || 
|-id=558 bgcolor=#d6d6d6
| 439558 ||  || — || February 12, 2008 || Kitt Peak || Spacewatch || — || align=right | 2.8 km || 
|-id=559 bgcolor=#E9E9E9
| 439559 ||  || — || February 2, 2005 || Kitt Peak || Spacewatch || — || align=right | 1.5 km || 
|-id=560 bgcolor=#E9E9E9
| 439560 ||  || — || January 30, 2009 || Kitt Peak || Spacewatch || — || align=right | 1.7 km || 
|-id=561 bgcolor=#E9E9E9
| 439561 ||  || — || October 30, 2007 || Mount Lemmon || Mount Lemmon Survey || — || align=right | 1.5 km || 
|-id=562 bgcolor=#E9E9E9
| 439562 ||  || — || March 19, 2010 || XuYi || PMO NEO || — || align=right | 1.2 km || 
|-id=563 bgcolor=#fefefe
| 439563 ||  || — || May 22, 2003 || Kitt Peak || Spacewatch || — || align=right | 1.1 km || 
|-id=564 bgcolor=#d6d6d6
| 439564 ||  || — || February 9, 2008 || Kitt Peak || Spacewatch || — || align=right | 2.7 km || 
|-id=565 bgcolor=#fefefe
| 439565 ||  || — || September 23, 2008 || Kitt Peak || Spacewatch || V || align=right data-sort-value="0.71" | 710 m || 
|-id=566 bgcolor=#d6d6d6
| 439566 ||  || — || April 1, 2009 || Mount Lemmon || Mount Lemmon Survey || — || align=right | 2.0 km || 
|-id=567 bgcolor=#d6d6d6
| 439567 ||  || — || August 28, 2005 || Kitt Peak || Spacewatch || — || align=right | 3.0 km || 
|-id=568 bgcolor=#E9E9E9
| 439568 ||  || — || March 8, 2005 || Mount Lemmon || Mount Lemmon Survey || — || align=right | 1.3 km || 
|-id=569 bgcolor=#E9E9E9
| 439569 ||  || — || February 2, 2005 || Kitt Peak || Spacewatch || — || align=right | 1.8 km || 
|-id=570 bgcolor=#d6d6d6
| 439570 ||  || — || October 11, 2001 || Kitt Peak || Spacewatch || 3:2 || align=right | 5.0 km || 
|-id=571 bgcolor=#E9E9E9
| 439571 ||  || — || March 10, 2005 || Kitt Peak || Spacewatch || — || align=right | 2.2 km || 
|-id=572 bgcolor=#E9E9E9
| 439572 ||  || — || September 13, 2007 || Mount Lemmon || Mount Lemmon Survey || — || align=right | 1.6 km || 
|-id=573 bgcolor=#fefefe
| 439573 ||  || — || October 13, 2002 || Kitt Peak || Spacewatch || — || align=right data-sort-value="0.94" | 940 m || 
|-id=574 bgcolor=#E9E9E9
| 439574 ||  || — || September 14, 2007 || Mount Lemmon || Mount Lemmon Survey || — || align=right | 1.4 km || 
|-id=575 bgcolor=#E9E9E9
| 439575 ||  || — || September 12, 2007 || Kitt Peak || Spacewatch || — || align=right | 1.8 km || 
|-id=576 bgcolor=#E9E9E9
| 439576 ||  || — || June 3, 2006 || Mount Lemmon || Mount Lemmon Survey || — || align=right | 2.7 km || 
|-id=577 bgcolor=#E9E9E9
| 439577 ||  || — || March 8, 2005 || Anderson Mesa || LONEOS || — || align=right | 2.8 km || 
|-id=578 bgcolor=#d6d6d6
| 439578 ||  || — || May 14, 2005 || Kitt Peak || Spacewatch || NAE || align=right | 2.2 km || 
|-id=579 bgcolor=#E9E9E9
| 439579 ||  || — || July 4, 2010 || WISE || WISE || KON || align=right | 3.5 km || 
|-id=580 bgcolor=#E9E9E9
| 439580 ||  || — || February 19, 2010 || Kitt Peak || Spacewatch || — || align=right data-sort-value="0.80" | 800 m || 
|-id=581 bgcolor=#d6d6d6
| 439581 ||  || — || April 14, 2005 || Kitt Peak || Spacewatch || — || align=right | 2.7 km || 
|-id=582 bgcolor=#d6d6d6
| 439582 ||  || — || September 13, 2005 || Kitt Peak || Spacewatch || HYG || align=right | 2.7 km || 
|-id=583 bgcolor=#E9E9E9
| 439583 ||  || — || December 29, 2008 || Mount Lemmon || Mount Lemmon Survey || — || align=right | 2.5 km || 
|-id=584 bgcolor=#d6d6d6
| 439584 ||  || — || October 16, 2007 || Mount Lemmon || Mount Lemmon Survey || KOR || align=right | 1.4 km || 
|-id=585 bgcolor=#d6d6d6
| 439585 ||  || — || March 19, 2009 || Kitt Peak || Spacewatch || EOS || align=right | 2.1 km || 
|-id=586 bgcolor=#fefefe
| 439586 ||  || — || January 26, 2006 || Mount Lemmon || Mount Lemmon Survey || NYS || align=right data-sort-value="0.78" | 780 m || 
|-id=587 bgcolor=#fefefe
| 439587 ||  || — || April 22, 2007 || Kitt Peak || Spacewatch || — || align=right data-sort-value="0.67" | 670 m || 
|-id=588 bgcolor=#d6d6d6
| 439588 ||  || — || April 19, 2009 || Kitt Peak || Spacewatch || — || align=right | 3.2 km || 
|-id=589 bgcolor=#d6d6d6
| 439589 ||  || — || July 25, 2006 || Mount Lemmon || Mount Lemmon Survey || — || align=right | 2.6 km || 
|-id=590 bgcolor=#E9E9E9
| 439590 ||  || — || August 24, 2007 || Kitt Peak || Spacewatch || — || align=right | 2.3 km || 
|-id=591 bgcolor=#E9E9E9
| 439591 ||  || — || March 18, 2010 || Mount Lemmon || Mount Lemmon Survey || — || align=right | 1.2 km || 
|-id=592 bgcolor=#E9E9E9
| 439592 ||  || — || December 21, 2008 || Mount Lemmon || Mount Lemmon Survey || — || align=right | 2.2 km || 
|-id=593 bgcolor=#fefefe
| 439593 ||  || — || March 31, 2003 || Kitt Peak || Spacewatch || CLA || align=right | 1.4 km || 
|-id=594 bgcolor=#fefefe
| 439594 ||  || — || January 26, 2006 || Kitt Peak || Spacewatch || — || align=right | 1.2 km || 
|-id=595 bgcolor=#d6d6d6
| 439595 ||  || — || February 28, 2008 || Kitt Peak || Spacewatch || — || align=right | 3.2 km || 
|-id=596 bgcolor=#E9E9E9
| 439596 ||  || — || December 30, 2008 || Kitt Peak || Spacewatch || — || align=right | 1.5 km || 
|-id=597 bgcolor=#d6d6d6
| 439597 ||  || — || February 24, 2009 || Kitt Peak || Spacewatch || — || align=right | 2.5 km || 
|-id=598 bgcolor=#fefefe
| 439598 ||  || — || February 9, 1999 || Kitt Peak || Spacewatch || — || align=right data-sort-value="0.76" | 760 m || 
|-id=599 bgcolor=#E9E9E9
| 439599 ||  || — || October 19, 2003 || Kitt Peak || Spacewatch || — || align=right | 1.3 km || 
|-id=600 bgcolor=#d6d6d6
| 439600 ||  || — || March 2, 2009 || Mount Lemmon || Mount Lemmon Survey || — || align=right | 2.5 km || 
|}

439601–439700 

|-bgcolor=#d6d6d6
| 439601 ||  || — || March 17, 2004 || Kitt Peak || Spacewatch || — || align=right | 3.1 km || 
|-id=602 bgcolor=#E9E9E9
| 439602 ||  || — || February 2, 2006 || Mount Lemmon || Mount Lemmon Survey || — || align=right | 1.0 km || 
|-id=603 bgcolor=#E9E9E9
| 439603 ||  || — || September 12, 2007 || Kitt Peak || Spacewatch || — || align=right | 1.3 km || 
|-id=604 bgcolor=#E9E9E9
| 439604 ||  || — || September 12, 2007 || Mount Lemmon || Mount Lemmon Survey || — || align=right | 1.5 km || 
|-id=605 bgcolor=#d6d6d6
| 439605 ||  || — || September 15, 2006 || Kitt Peak || Spacewatch || — || align=right | 2.8 km || 
|-id=606 bgcolor=#d6d6d6
| 439606 ||  || — || December 31, 2002 || Socorro || LINEAR || — || align=right | 4.1 km || 
|-id=607 bgcolor=#E9E9E9
| 439607 ||  || — || November 1, 2008 || Mount Lemmon || Mount Lemmon Survey || — || align=right data-sort-value="0.92" | 920 m || 
|-id=608 bgcolor=#E9E9E9
| 439608 ||  || — || December 22, 2008 || Kitt Peak || Spacewatch || — || align=right | 1.7 km || 
|-id=609 bgcolor=#fefefe
| 439609 ||  || — || February 17, 2007 || Catalina || CSS || — || align=right data-sort-value="0.77" | 770 m || 
|-id=610 bgcolor=#E9E9E9
| 439610 ||  || — || March 12, 2005 || Kitt Peak || Spacewatch || — || align=right | 2.6 km || 
|-id=611 bgcolor=#d6d6d6
| 439611 ||  || — || January 19, 2008 || Mount Lemmon || Mount Lemmon Survey || — || align=right | 3.0 km || 
|-id=612 bgcolor=#fefefe
| 439612 ||  || — || February 21, 2007 || Kitt Peak || Spacewatch || — || align=right data-sort-value="0.85" | 850 m || 
|-id=613 bgcolor=#E9E9E9
| 439613 ||  || — || February 19, 2001 || Anderson Mesa || LONEOS || — || align=right | 2.3 km || 
|-id=614 bgcolor=#E9E9E9
| 439614 ||  || — || September 15, 2012 || Catalina || CSS || CLO || align=right | 2.4 km || 
|-id=615 bgcolor=#E9E9E9
| 439615 ||  || — || May 20, 2006 || Kitt Peak || Spacewatch || — || align=right | 1.6 km || 
|-id=616 bgcolor=#d6d6d6
| 439616 ||  || — || January 19, 2004 || Kitt Peak || Spacewatch || — || align=right | 2.5 km || 
|-id=617 bgcolor=#d6d6d6
| 439617 ||  || — || August 29, 2005 || Kitt Peak || Spacewatch || — || align=right | 3.3 km || 
|-id=618 bgcolor=#d6d6d6
| 439618 ||  || — || February 9, 2008 || Mount Lemmon || Mount Lemmon Survey || — || align=right | 2.7 km || 
|-id=619 bgcolor=#d6d6d6
| 439619 ||  || — || December 2, 2012 || Catalina || CSS || — || align=right | 3.1 km || 
|-id=620 bgcolor=#d6d6d6
| 439620 ||  || — || December 6, 2007 || Kitt Peak || Spacewatch || — || align=right | 2.7 km || 
|-id=621 bgcolor=#d6d6d6
| 439621 ||  || — || December 30, 2007 || Mount Lemmon || Mount Lemmon Survey || EOS || align=right | 2.0 km || 
|-id=622 bgcolor=#fefefe
| 439622 ||  || — || January 29, 1995 || Kitt Peak || Spacewatch || — || align=right data-sort-value="0.53" | 530 m || 
|-id=623 bgcolor=#d6d6d6
| 439623 ||  || — || February 12, 2008 || Mount Lemmon || Mount Lemmon Survey || LIX || align=right | 3.1 km || 
|-id=624 bgcolor=#E9E9E9
| 439624 ||  || — || October 24, 2008 || Kitt Peak || Spacewatch || — || align=right | 1.1 km || 
|-id=625 bgcolor=#fefefe
| 439625 ||  || — || November 26, 2005 || Kitt Peak || Spacewatch || — || align=right data-sort-value="0.84" | 840 m || 
|-id=626 bgcolor=#E9E9E9
| 439626 ||  || — || March 10, 2010 || XuYi || PMO NEO || — || align=right | 1.5 km || 
|-id=627 bgcolor=#E9E9E9
| 439627 ||  || — || April 8, 2010 || Kitt Peak || Spacewatch || — || align=right | 1.3 km || 
|-id=628 bgcolor=#E9E9E9
| 439628 ||  || — || October 30, 2008 || Kitt Peak || Spacewatch || — || align=right data-sort-value="0.98" | 980 m || 
|-id=629 bgcolor=#fefefe
| 439629 ||  || — || December 8, 2005 || Kitt Peak || Spacewatch || — || align=right data-sort-value="0.98" | 980 m || 
|-id=630 bgcolor=#E9E9E9
| 439630 ||  || — || February 27, 2010 || WISE || WISE || — || align=right | 2.2 km || 
|-id=631 bgcolor=#E9E9E9
| 439631 ||  || — || November 6, 2007 || Kitt Peak || Spacewatch || — || align=right | 3.8 km || 
|-id=632 bgcolor=#d6d6d6
| 439632 ||  || — || December 31, 2007 || Mount Lemmon || Mount Lemmon Survey || — || align=right | 2.7 km || 
|-id=633 bgcolor=#fefefe
| 439633 ||  || — || April 7, 2003 || Kitt Peak || Spacewatch || — || align=right data-sort-value="0.87" | 870 m || 
|-id=634 bgcolor=#d6d6d6
| 439634 ||  || — || June 1, 2009 || Catalina || CSS || — || align=right | 3.7 km || 
|-id=635 bgcolor=#d6d6d6
| 439635 ||  || — || September 30, 2006 || Catalina || CSS || KOR || align=right | 2.0 km || 
|-id=636 bgcolor=#d6d6d6
| 439636 ||  || — || November 27, 2006 || Mount Lemmon || Mount Lemmon Survey || EOS || align=right | 3.0 km || 
|-id=637 bgcolor=#E9E9E9
| 439637 ||  || — || June 3, 2010 || Kitt Peak || Spacewatch || — || align=right | 1.9 km || 
|-id=638 bgcolor=#E9E9E9
| 439638 ||  || — || December 15, 2004 || Kitt Peak || Spacewatch || — || align=right | 1.3 km || 
|-id=639 bgcolor=#d6d6d6
| 439639 ||  || — || January 11, 2008 || Mount Lemmon || Mount Lemmon Survey || — || align=right | 2.8 km || 
|-id=640 bgcolor=#d6d6d6
| 439640 ||  || — || January 11, 2008 || Kitt Peak || Spacewatch || — || align=right | 2.7 km || 
|-id=641 bgcolor=#E9E9E9
| 439641 ||  || — || October 12, 2007 || Mount Lemmon || Mount Lemmon Survey || — || align=right | 1.6 km || 
|-id=642 bgcolor=#d6d6d6
| 439642 ||  || — || May 22, 2010 || WISE || WISE || — || align=right | 2.2 km || 
|-id=643 bgcolor=#fefefe
| 439643 ||  || — || February 1, 2006 || Kitt Peak || Spacewatch || NYS || align=right data-sort-value="0.83" | 830 m || 
|-id=644 bgcolor=#E9E9E9
| 439644 ||  || — || August 19, 2006 || Kitt Peak || Spacewatch || AGN || align=right | 1.1 km || 
|-id=645 bgcolor=#E9E9E9
| 439645 ||  || — || November 19, 2008 || Mount Lemmon || Mount Lemmon Survey || EUN || align=right | 1.5 km || 
|-id=646 bgcolor=#E9E9E9
| 439646 ||  || — || September 30, 2003 || Kitt Peak || Spacewatch || — || align=right | 1.1 km || 
|-id=647 bgcolor=#d6d6d6
| 439647 ||  || — || February 9, 2003 || Kitt Peak || Spacewatch || — || align=right | 2.6 km || 
|-id=648 bgcolor=#E9E9E9
| 439648 ||  || — || September 10, 2007 || Kitt Peak || Spacewatch || — || align=right | 1.3 km || 
|-id=649 bgcolor=#d6d6d6
| 439649 ||  || — || April 5, 2003 || Kitt Peak || Spacewatch || — || align=right | 3.0 km || 
|-id=650 bgcolor=#d6d6d6
| 439650 ||  || — || January 18, 2012 || Mount Lemmon || Mount Lemmon Survey || SHU3:2 || align=right | 5.8 km || 
|-id=651 bgcolor=#E9E9E9
| 439651 ||  || — || March 1, 2005 || Kitt Peak || Spacewatch || — || align=right | 1.7 km || 
|-id=652 bgcolor=#d6d6d6
| 439652 ||  || — || September 18, 1995 || Kitt Peak || Spacewatch || EOS || align=right | 1.9 km || 
|-id=653 bgcolor=#d6d6d6
| 439653 ||  || — || March 26, 2004 || Kitt Peak || Spacewatch || — || align=right | 2.9 km || 
|-id=654 bgcolor=#E9E9E9
| 439654 ||  || — || April 21, 2006 || Kitt Peak || Spacewatch || — || align=right | 1.2 km || 
|-id=655 bgcolor=#E9E9E9
| 439655 ||  || — || November 18, 2003 || Kitt Peak || Spacewatch || — || align=right | 1.5 km || 
|-id=656 bgcolor=#d6d6d6
| 439656 ||  || — || April 4, 2008 || Mount Lemmon || Mount Lemmon Survey || — || align=right | 3.6 km || 
|-id=657 bgcolor=#E9E9E9
| 439657 ||  || — || November 4, 2007 || Mount Lemmon || Mount Lemmon Survey || — || align=right | 1.6 km || 
|-id=658 bgcolor=#d6d6d6
| 439658 ||  || — || March 28, 2008 || Mount Lemmon || Mount Lemmon Survey || — || align=right | 2.3 km || 
|-id=659 bgcolor=#E9E9E9
| 439659 ||  || — || December 13, 2004 || Kitt Peak || Spacewatch || (5) || align=right | 1.0 km || 
|-id=660 bgcolor=#d6d6d6
| 439660 ||  || — || October 3, 2006 || Mount Lemmon || Mount Lemmon Survey || KOR || align=right | 1.4 km || 
|-id=661 bgcolor=#d6d6d6
| 439661 ||  || — || September 27, 2006 || Kitt Peak || Spacewatch || — || align=right | 2.1 km || 
|-id=662 bgcolor=#E9E9E9
| 439662 ||  || — || October 10, 2007 || Mount Lemmon || Mount Lemmon Survey || — || align=right | 1.9 km || 
|-id=663 bgcolor=#E9E9E9
| 439663 ||  || — || September 18, 2003 || Kitt Peak || Spacewatch || — || align=right | 1.1 km || 
|-id=664 bgcolor=#d6d6d6
| 439664 ||  || — || October 28, 2011 || Mount Lemmon || Mount Lemmon Survey || — || align=right | 2.5 km || 
|-id=665 bgcolor=#d6d6d6
| 439665 ||  || — || October 26, 2005 || Kitt Peak || Spacewatch || — || align=right | 4.3 km || 
|-id=666 bgcolor=#d6d6d6
| 439666 ||  || — || November 1, 2005 || Mount Lemmon || Mount Lemmon Survey || — || align=right | 2.7 km || 
|-id=667 bgcolor=#d6d6d6
| 439667 ||  || — || April 21, 2009 || Kitt Peak || Spacewatch || — || align=right | 2.4 km || 
|-id=668 bgcolor=#E9E9E9
| 439668 ||  || — || February 3, 2009 || Kitt Peak || Spacewatch || — || align=right | 1.6 km || 
|-id=669 bgcolor=#d6d6d6
| 439669 ||  || — || February 26, 2008 || Mount Lemmon || Mount Lemmon Survey || — || align=right | 2.8 km || 
|-id=670 bgcolor=#fefefe
| 439670 ||  || — || September 2, 2000 || Anderson Mesa || LONEOS || MAS || align=right | 1.0 km || 
|-id=671 bgcolor=#d6d6d6
| 439671 ||  || — || March 31, 2003 || Kitt Peak || Spacewatch || fast? || align=right | 3.4 km || 
|-id=672 bgcolor=#E9E9E9
| 439672 ||  || — || April 14, 2010 || Kitt Peak || Spacewatch || — || align=right | 1.2 km || 
|-id=673 bgcolor=#d6d6d6
| 439673 ||  || — || June 16, 2005 || Mount Lemmon || Mount Lemmon Survey || — || align=right | 2.3 km || 
|-id=674 bgcolor=#d6d6d6
| 439674 ||  || — || June 8, 2010 || WISE || WISE || — || align=right | 4.6 km || 
|-id=675 bgcolor=#d6d6d6
| 439675 ||  || — || September 6, 2008 || Kitt Peak || Spacewatch || 3:2 || align=right | 3.7 km || 
|-id=676 bgcolor=#d6d6d6
| 439676 ||  || — || April 4, 2008 || Mount Lemmon || Mount Lemmon Survey || VER || align=right | 3.2 km || 
|-id=677 bgcolor=#d6d6d6
| 439677 ||  || — || December 14, 2010 || Mount Lemmon || Mount Lemmon Survey || 3:2 || align=right | 4.8 km || 
|-id=678 bgcolor=#d6d6d6
| 439678 ||  || — || April 5, 2003 || Kitt Peak || Spacewatch || — || align=right | 3.8 km || 
|-id=679 bgcolor=#E9E9E9
| 439679 ||  || — || October 2, 2006 || Mount Lemmon || Mount Lemmon Survey || — || align=right | 1.8 km || 
|-id=680 bgcolor=#d6d6d6
| 439680 ||  || — || January 10, 2007 || Kitt Peak || Spacewatch || — || align=right | 3.4 km || 
|-id=681 bgcolor=#d6d6d6
| 439681 ||  || — || April 8, 2008 || Mount Lemmon || Mount Lemmon Survey || EOS || align=right | 1.8 km || 
|-id=682 bgcolor=#E9E9E9
| 439682 ||  || — || October 11, 2007 || Mount Lemmon || Mount Lemmon Survey || — || align=right | 1.7 km || 
|-id=683 bgcolor=#E9E9E9
| 439683 ||  || — || February 26, 2009 || Kitt Peak || Spacewatch || MRX || align=right | 1.0 km || 
|-id=684 bgcolor=#d6d6d6
| 439684 ||  || — || November 22, 2006 || Kitt Peak || Spacewatch || TEL || align=right | 1.7 km || 
|-id=685 bgcolor=#d6d6d6
| 439685 ||  || — || December 1, 2006 || Mount Lemmon || Mount Lemmon Survey || — || align=right | 3.5 km || 
|-id=686 bgcolor=#d6d6d6
| 439686 ||  || — || May 29, 2009 || Kitt Peak || Spacewatch || — || align=right | 2.9 km || 
|-id=687 bgcolor=#d6d6d6
| 439687 ||  || — || October 25, 2005 || Mount Lemmon || Mount Lemmon Survey || — || align=right | 3.6 km || 
|-id=688 bgcolor=#d6d6d6
| 439688 ||  || — || April 20, 2004 || Kitt Peak || Spacewatch || BRA || align=right | 1.6 km || 
|-id=689 bgcolor=#d6d6d6
| 439689 ||  || — || January 31, 2006 || Mount Lemmon || Mount Lemmon Survey || 7:4 || align=right | 3.3 km || 
|-id=690 bgcolor=#d6d6d6
| 439690 ||  || — || November 16, 2006 || Mount Lemmon || Mount Lemmon Survey || — || align=right | 2.7 km || 
|-id=691 bgcolor=#E9E9E9
| 439691 ||  || — || April 14, 2005 || Kitt Peak || Spacewatch || — || align=right | 2.0 km || 
|-id=692 bgcolor=#d6d6d6
| 439692 ||  || — || March 29, 2008 || Catalina || CSS || VER || align=right | 3.6 km || 
|-id=693 bgcolor=#d6d6d6
| 439693 ||  || — || October 22, 2005 || Kitt Peak || Spacewatch || — || align=right | 3.8 km || 
|-id=694 bgcolor=#d6d6d6
| 439694 ||  || — || December 7, 1999 || Kitt Peak || Spacewatch || — || align=right | 3.7 km || 
|-id=695 bgcolor=#d6d6d6
| 439695 ||  || — || November 28, 2005 || Mount Lemmon || Mount Lemmon Survey || — || align=right | 2.5 km || 
|-id=696 bgcolor=#d6d6d6
| 439696 ||  || — || June 26, 2010 || WISE || WISE || URS || align=right | 3.4 km || 
|-id=697 bgcolor=#d6d6d6
| 439697 ||  || — || May 2, 2003 || Kitt Peak || Spacewatch || — || align=right | 3.9 km || 
|-id=698 bgcolor=#d6d6d6
| 439698 ||  || — || April 3, 2008 || Mount Lemmon || Mount Lemmon Survey || — || align=right | 2.5 km || 
|-id=699 bgcolor=#E9E9E9
| 439699 ||  || — || January 29, 2009 || Mount Lemmon || Mount Lemmon Survey || — || align=right | 1.8 km || 
|-id=700 bgcolor=#fefefe
| 439700 ||  || — || December 26, 2005 || Kitt Peak || Spacewatch || V || align=right data-sort-value="0.62" | 620 m || 
|}

439701–439800 

|-bgcolor=#E9E9E9
| 439701 ||  || — || March 10, 2005 || Catalina || CSS || MAR || align=right | 1.4 km || 
|-id=702 bgcolor=#d6d6d6
| 439702 ||  || — || March 11, 2008 || Kitt Peak || Spacewatch || — || align=right | 3.8 km || 
|-id=703 bgcolor=#d6d6d6
| 439703 ||  || — || November 18, 2011 || Mount Lemmon || Mount Lemmon Survey || — || align=right | 3.5 km || 
|-id=704 bgcolor=#d6d6d6
| 439704 ||  || — || March 1, 2008 || Catalina || CSS || — || align=right | 3.6 km || 
|-id=705 bgcolor=#d6d6d6
| 439705 ||  || — || October 29, 2005 || Catalina || CSS || — || align=right | 3.7 km || 
|-id=706 bgcolor=#E9E9E9
| 439706 ||  || — || May 4, 2005 || Kitt Peak || Spacewatch || — || align=right | 2.3 km || 
|-id=707 bgcolor=#d6d6d6
| 439707 ||  || — || October 11, 2010 || Mount Lemmon || Mount Lemmon Survey || — || align=right | 2.8 km || 
|-id=708 bgcolor=#d6d6d6
| 439708 ||  || — || April 5, 2008 || Mount Lemmon || Mount Lemmon Survey || — || align=right | 3.4 km || 
|-id=709 bgcolor=#d6d6d6
| 439709 ||  || — || April 8, 2008 || Kitt Peak || Spacewatch || — || align=right | 3.4 km || 
|-id=710 bgcolor=#E9E9E9
| 439710 ||  || — || March 27, 2009 || Siding Spring || SSS || — || align=right | 3.9 km || 
|-id=711 bgcolor=#fefefe
| 439711 ||  || — || November 30, 2008 || Mount Lemmon || Mount Lemmon Survey || — || align=right | 1.2 km || 
|-id=712 bgcolor=#d6d6d6
| 439712 ||  || — || January 13, 2002 || Socorro || LINEAR || EOS || align=right | 2.0 km || 
|-id=713 bgcolor=#E9E9E9
| 439713 ||  || — || February 22, 2004 || Kitt Peak || Spacewatch || PAD || align=right | 2.0 km || 
|-id=714 bgcolor=#d6d6d6
| 439714 ||  || — || November 24, 2000 || Anderson Mesa || LONEOS || — || align=right | 3.4 km || 
|-id=715 bgcolor=#E9E9E9
| 439715 ||  || — || October 21, 2006 || Kitt Peak || Spacewatch || — || align=right | 2.7 km || 
|-id=716 bgcolor=#d6d6d6
| 439716 ||  || — || October 30, 2005 || Catalina || CSS || — || align=right | 3.2 km || 
|-id=717 bgcolor=#d6d6d6
| 439717 ||  || — || November 2, 2010 || Mount Lemmon || Mount Lemmon Survey || THB || align=right | 3.2 km || 
|-id=718 bgcolor=#d6d6d6
| 439718 Danielcervantes ||  ||  || April 12, 2010 || WISE || WISE || — || align=right | 4.0 km || 
|-id=719 bgcolor=#d6d6d6
| 439719 ||  || — || March 18, 2004 || Socorro || LINEAR || — || align=right | 1.8 km || 
|-id=720 bgcolor=#fefefe
| 439720 ||  || — || December 13, 2006 || Mount Lemmon || Mount Lemmon Survey || — || align=right data-sort-value="0.93" | 930 m || 
|-id=721 bgcolor=#d6d6d6
| 439721 ||  || — || April 16, 2004 || Kitt Peak || Spacewatch || EOS || align=right | 2.1 km || 
|-id=722 bgcolor=#E9E9E9
| 439722 ||  || — || April 21, 2006 || Kitt Peak || Spacewatch || — || align=right | 2.8 km || 
|-id=723 bgcolor=#E9E9E9
| 439723 ||  || — || August 11, 2007 || Socorro || LINEAR || — || align=right | 2.1 km || 
|-id=724 bgcolor=#d6d6d6
| 439724 ||  || — || March 9, 2005 || Catalina || CSS || — || align=right | 2.6 km || 
|-id=725 bgcolor=#E9E9E9
| 439725 ||  || — || November 29, 2005 || Mount Lemmon || Mount Lemmon Survey || — || align=right | 1.2 km || 
|-id=726 bgcolor=#d6d6d6
| 439726 ||  || — || May 14, 2004 || Kitt Peak || Spacewatch || — || align=right | 3.3 km || 
|-id=727 bgcolor=#E9E9E9
| 439727 ||  || — || January 7, 2010 || Mount Lemmon || Mount Lemmon Survey || — || align=right | 1.3 km || 
|-id=728 bgcolor=#E9E9E9
| 439728 ||  || — || January 9, 2006 || Kitt Peak || Spacewatch || KON || align=right | 2.2 km || 
|-id=729 bgcolor=#E9E9E9
| 439729 ||  || — || September 6, 2008 || Mount Lemmon || Mount Lemmon Survey || — || align=right | 1.1 km || 
|-id=730 bgcolor=#d6d6d6
| 439730 ||  || — || April 21, 1998 || Socorro || LINEAR || Tj (2.98) || align=right | 7.4 km || 
|-id=731 bgcolor=#C2FFFF
| 439731 ||  || — || September 4, 2008 || Kitt Peak || Spacewatch || L4 || align=right | 7.9 km || 
|-id=732 bgcolor=#C2FFFF
| 439732 ||  || — || September 5, 2008 || Kitt Peak || Spacewatch || L4 || align=right | 11 km || 
|-id=733 bgcolor=#E9E9E9
| 439733 ||  || — || September 18, 2009 || Mount Lemmon || Mount Lemmon Survey || — || align=right | 1.3 km || 
|-id=734 bgcolor=#E9E9E9
| 439734 ||  || — || May 11, 2007 || Mount Lemmon || Mount Lemmon Survey || — || align=right | 1.1 km || 
|-id=735 bgcolor=#d6d6d6
| 439735 ||  || — || February 11, 2004 || Kitt Peak || Spacewatch || — || align=right | 2.5 km || 
|-id=736 bgcolor=#E9E9E9
| 439736 ||  || — || May 25, 2003 || Kitt Peak || Spacewatch || — || align=right | 1.2 km || 
|-id=737 bgcolor=#E9E9E9
| 439737 ||  || — || May 25, 2007 || Mount Lemmon || Mount Lemmon Survey || — || align=right | 1.4 km || 
|-id=738 bgcolor=#d6d6d6
| 439738 ||  || — || July 22, 2000 || Prescott || P. G. Comba || — || align=right | 3.1 km || 
|-id=739 bgcolor=#E9E9E9
| 439739 ||  || — || September 27, 2008 || Catalina || CSS || — || align=right | 2.9 km || 
|-id=740 bgcolor=#fefefe
| 439740 ||  || — || December 17, 2003 || Socorro || LINEAR || H || align=right data-sort-value="0.72" | 720 m || 
|-id=741 bgcolor=#E9E9E9
| 439741 ||  || — || January 25, 2006 || Anderson Mesa || LONEOS || — || align=right | 2.3 km || 
|-id=742 bgcolor=#d6d6d6
| 439742 ||  || — || March 13, 2010 || Kitt Peak || Spacewatch || BRA || align=right | 1.9 km || 
|-id=743 bgcolor=#d6d6d6
| 439743 ||  || — || April 16, 2004 || Socorro || LINEAR || — || align=right | 4.0 km || 
|-id=744 bgcolor=#E9E9E9
| 439744 ||  || — || September 3, 2008 || Kitt Peak || Spacewatch || — || align=right | 1.2 km || 
|-id=745 bgcolor=#E9E9E9
| 439745 ||  || — || April 7, 2006 || Anderson Mesa || LONEOS || EUN || align=right | 1.7 km || 
|-id=746 bgcolor=#fefefe
| 439746 ||  || — || March 17, 2004 || Kitt Peak || Spacewatch || H || align=right data-sort-value="0.43" | 430 m || 
|-id=747 bgcolor=#E9E9E9
| 439747 ||  || — || March 5, 2006 || Catalina || CSS || — || align=right | 3.3 km || 
|-id=748 bgcolor=#fefefe
| 439748 ||  || — || June 27, 1997 || Kitt Peak || Spacewatch || — || align=right data-sort-value="0.85" | 850 m || 
|-id=749 bgcolor=#d6d6d6
| 439749 ||  || — || July 25, 1995 || Kitt Peak || Spacewatch || — || align=right | 2.7 km || 
|-id=750 bgcolor=#E9E9E9
| 439750 ||  || — || October 24, 2009 || Mount Lemmon || Mount Lemmon Survey || — || align=right | 3.4 km || 
|-id=751 bgcolor=#E9E9E9
| 439751 ||  || — || October 7, 2008 || Mount Lemmon || Mount Lemmon Survey || — || align=right | 2.1 km || 
|-id=752 bgcolor=#fefefe
| 439752 ||  || — || December 1, 2006 || Mount Lemmon || Mount Lemmon Survey || V || align=right data-sort-value="0.86" | 860 m || 
|-id=753 bgcolor=#d6d6d6
| 439753 ||  || — || November 20, 2001 || Socorro || LINEAR || — || align=right | 3.4 km || 
|-id=754 bgcolor=#E9E9E9
| 439754 ||  || — || February 24, 2006 || Mount Lemmon || Mount Lemmon Survey || — || align=right | 1.5 km || 
|-id=755 bgcolor=#fefefe
| 439755 ||  || — || May 31, 2000 || Kitt Peak || Spacewatch || — || align=right data-sort-value="0.87" | 870 m || 
|-id=756 bgcolor=#fefefe
| 439756 ||  || — || December 24, 2006 || Kitt Peak || Spacewatch || — || align=right data-sort-value="0.98" | 980 m || 
|-id=757 bgcolor=#E9E9E9
| 439757 ||  || — || October 21, 2003 || Kitt Peak || Spacewatch || — || align=right | 2.2 km || 
|-id=758 bgcolor=#fefefe
| 439758 ||  || — || May 3, 2005 || Kitt Peak || Spacewatch || — || align=right data-sort-value="0.64" | 640 m || 
|-id=759 bgcolor=#E9E9E9
| 439759 ||  || — || May 29, 2010 || WISE || WISE || — || align=right | 3.0 km || 
|-id=760 bgcolor=#E9E9E9
| 439760 ||  || — || February 25, 2006 || Mount Lemmon || Mount Lemmon Survey || — || align=right | 1.6 km || 
|-id=761 bgcolor=#E9E9E9
| 439761 ||  || — || November 15, 1995 || Kitt Peak || Spacewatch || — || align=right | 1.6 km || 
|-id=762 bgcolor=#fefefe
| 439762 ||  || — || September 28, 2009 || Mount Lemmon || Mount Lemmon Survey || — || align=right data-sort-value="0.82" | 820 m || 
|-id=763 bgcolor=#fefefe
| 439763 ||  || — || December 13, 2006 || Mount Lemmon || Mount Lemmon Survey || — || align=right | 1.0 km || 
|-id=764 bgcolor=#d6d6d6
| 439764 ||  || — || November 13, 2007 || Mount Lemmon || Mount Lemmon Survey || LIX || align=right | 3.7 km || 
|-id=765 bgcolor=#d6d6d6
| 439765 ||  || — || June 10, 2010 || Catalina || CSS || — || align=right | 3.2 km || 
|-id=766 bgcolor=#E9E9E9
| 439766 ||  || — || January 21, 2002 || Kitt Peak || Spacewatch || (5) || align=right | 3.0 km || 
|-id=767 bgcolor=#E9E9E9
| 439767 ||  || — || March 25, 2006 || Kitt Peak || Spacewatch || EUN || align=right | 1.6 km || 
|-id=768 bgcolor=#E9E9E9
| 439768 ||  || — || October 9, 2004 || Kitt Peak || Spacewatch || — || align=right | 4.1 km || 
|-id=769 bgcolor=#d6d6d6
| 439769 ||  || — || February 22, 2009 || Catalina || CSS || — || align=right | 4.0 km || 
|-id=770 bgcolor=#E9E9E9
| 439770 ||  || — || January 10, 2006 || Kitt Peak || Spacewatch || — || align=right | 1.6 km || 
|-id=771 bgcolor=#d6d6d6
| 439771 ||  || — || March 23, 2004 || Catalina || CSS || — || align=right | 3.2 km || 
|-id=772 bgcolor=#d6d6d6
| 439772 ||  || — || November 7, 2012 || Mount Lemmon || Mount Lemmon Survey || — || align=right | 4.3 km || 
|-id=773 bgcolor=#d6d6d6
| 439773 ||  || — || March 10, 2005 || Catalina || CSS || — || align=right | 2.6 km || 
|-id=774 bgcolor=#E9E9E9
| 439774 ||  || — || December 17, 2009 || Kitt Peak || Spacewatch || — || align=right | 1.2 km || 
|-id=775 bgcolor=#d6d6d6
| 439775 ||  || — || January 29, 2009 || Mount Lemmon || Mount Lemmon Survey || EOS || align=right | 1.7 km || 
|-id=776 bgcolor=#d6d6d6
| 439776 ||  || — || June 5, 2010 || Kitt Peak || Spacewatch || EOS || align=right | 2.2 km || 
|-id=777 bgcolor=#d6d6d6
| 439777 ||  || — || November 13, 2006 || Catalina || CSS || VER || align=right | 3.4 km || 
|-id=778 bgcolor=#E9E9E9
| 439778 ||  || — || August 27, 1998 || Kitt Peak || Spacewatch || — || align=right | 2.3 km || 
|-id=779 bgcolor=#E9E9E9
| 439779 ||  || — || March 3, 2006 || Catalina || CSS || — || align=right | 1.5 km || 
|-id=780 bgcolor=#d6d6d6
| 439780 ||  || — || July 11, 2005 || Kitt Peak || Spacewatch || — || align=right | 3.5 km || 
|-id=781 bgcolor=#d6d6d6
| 439781 ||  || — || December 18, 2007 || Mount Lemmon || Mount Lemmon Survey || — || align=right | 3.3 km || 
|-id=782 bgcolor=#d6d6d6
| 439782 ||  || — || September 5, 1999 || Kitt Peak || Spacewatch || — || align=right | 2.7 km || 
|-id=783 bgcolor=#fefefe
| 439783 ||  || — || March 11, 2008 || Kitt Peak || Spacewatch || — || align=right data-sort-value="0.71" | 710 m || 
|-id=784 bgcolor=#E9E9E9
| 439784 ||  || — || November 10, 2004 || Kitt Peak || Spacewatch || EUN || align=right | 1.7 km || 
|-id=785 bgcolor=#fefefe
| 439785 ||  || — || November 17, 2006 || Mount Lemmon || Mount Lemmon Survey || — || align=right data-sort-value="0.81" | 810 m || 
|-id=786 bgcolor=#E9E9E9
| 439786 ||  || — || May 2, 2003 || Kitt Peak || Spacewatch || — || align=right | 1.0 km || 
|-id=787 bgcolor=#fefefe
| 439787 ||  || — || December 14, 2006 || Kitt Peak || Spacewatch || — || align=right data-sort-value="0.74" | 740 m || 
|-id=788 bgcolor=#E9E9E9
| 439788 ||  || — || February 21, 2006 || Catalina || CSS || — || align=right | 2.4 km || 
|-id=789 bgcolor=#fefefe
| 439789 ||  || — || April 11, 2005 || Kitt Peak || Spacewatch || — || align=right data-sort-value="0.98" | 980 m || 
|-id=790 bgcolor=#fefefe
| 439790 ||  || — || September 26, 2009 || Mount Lemmon || Mount Lemmon Survey || — || align=right data-sort-value="0.83" | 830 m || 
|-id=791 bgcolor=#fefefe
| 439791 ||  || — || February 9, 2008 || Kitt Peak || Spacewatch || — || align=right data-sort-value="0.77" | 770 m || 
|-id=792 bgcolor=#fefefe
| 439792 ||  || — || May 28, 1998 || Kitt Peak || Spacewatch || — || align=right data-sort-value="0.89" | 890 m || 
|-id=793 bgcolor=#d6d6d6
| 439793 ||  || — || May 9, 2005 || Kitt Peak || Spacewatch || EOS || align=right | 1.7 km || 
|-id=794 bgcolor=#fefefe
| 439794 ||  || — || March 16, 2008 || Kitt Peak || Spacewatch || — || align=right data-sort-value="0.78" | 780 m || 
|-id=795 bgcolor=#E9E9E9
| 439795 ||  || — || March 3, 2006 || Kitt Peak || Spacewatch || — || align=right | 1.1 km || 
|-id=796 bgcolor=#fefefe
| 439796 ||  || — || May 16, 2004 || Socorro || LINEAR || MAS || align=right data-sort-value="0.94" | 940 m || 
|-id=797 bgcolor=#fefefe
| 439797 ||  || — || April 7, 2008 || Kitt Peak || Spacewatch || — || align=right data-sort-value="0.71" | 710 m || 
|-id=798 bgcolor=#E9E9E9
| 439798 ||  || — || October 27, 2008 || Kitt Peak || Spacewatch || EUN || align=right | 1.3 km || 
|-id=799 bgcolor=#d6d6d6
| 439799 ||  || — || June 30, 2005 || Kitt Peak || Spacewatch || EOS || align=right | 2.1 km || 
|-id=800 bgcolor=#d6d6d6
| 439800 ||  || — || September 30, 2006 || Kitt Peak || Spacewatch || — || align=right | 3.3 km || 
|}

439801–439900 

|-bgcolor=#fefefe
| 439801 ||  || — || September 21, 2012 || Mount Lemmon || Mount Lemmon Survey || NYS || align=right data-sort-value="0.66" | 660 m || 
|-id=802 bgcolor=#fefefe
| 439802 ||  || — || March 18, 2004 || Socorro || LINEAR || — || align=right data-sort-value="0.93" | 930 m || 
|-id=803 bgcolor=#E9E9E9
| 439803 ||  || — || February 2, 2005 || Kitt Peak || Spacewatch || GEF || align=right | 1.5 km || 
|-id=804 bgcolor=#fefefe
| 439804 ||  || — || November 15, 2006 || Catalina || CSS || — || align=right | 1.1 km || 
|-id=805 bgcolor=#E9E9E9
| 439805 ||  || — || December 4, 1996 || Kitt Peak || Spacewatch || — || align=right | 1.9 km || 
|-id=806 bgcolor=#E9E9E9
| 439806 ||  || — || March 3, 2006 || Mount Lemmon || Mount Lemmon Survey || — || align=right | 1.5 km || 
|-id=807 bgcolor=#d6d6d6
| 439807 ||  || — || March 15, 2009 || Mount Lemmon || Mount Lemmon Survey || — || align=right | 5.3 km || 
|-id=808 bgcolor=#d6d6d6
| 439808 ||  || — || March 9, 2003 || Anderson Mesa || LONEOS || — || align=right | 5.2 km || 
|-id=809 bgcolor=#d6d6d6
| 439809 ||  || — || February 1, 2008 || Kitt Peak || Spacewatch || EOS || align=right | 2.0 km || 
|-id=810 bgcolor=#d6d6d6
| 439810 ||  || — || November 5, 2007 || Mount Lemmon || Mount Lemmon Survey || — || align=right | 3.7 km || 
|-id=811 bgcolor=#d6d6d6
| 439811 ||  || — || March 24, 2003 || Kitt Peak || Spacewatch || — || align=right | 3.3 km || 
|-id=812 bgcolor=#d6d6d6
| 439812 ||  || — || April 26, 2004 || Socorro || LINEAR || — || align=right | 4.5 km || 
|-id=813 bgcolor=#E9E9E9
| 439813 ||  || — || March 25, 2006 || Catalina || CSS || EUN || align=right | 1.4 km || 
|-id=814 bgcolor=#E9E9E9
| 439814 ||  || — || December 10, 2004 || Kitt Peak || Spacewatch || — || align=right | 1.5 km || 
|-id=815 bgcolor=#fefefe
| 439815 ||  || — || April 25, 2004 || Kitt Peak || Spacewatch || — || align=right data-sort-value="0.83" | 830 m || 
|-id=816 bgcolor=#d6d6d6
| 439816 ||  || — || October 15, 2007 || Kitt Peak || Spacewatch || — || align=right | 2.7 km || 
|-id=817 bgcolor=#fefefe
| 439817 ||  || — || January 9, 2007 || Mount Lemmon || Mount Lemmon Survey || — || align=right data-sort-value="0.74" | 740 m || 
|-id=818 bgcolor=#d6d6d6
| 439818 ||  || — || September 20, 2006 || Anderson Mesa || LONEOS || — || align=right | 3.1 km || 
|-id=819 bgcolor=#E9E9E9
| 439819 ||  || — || December 11, 2004 || Kitt Peak || Spacewatch || — || align=right | 2.0 km || 
|-id=820 bgcolor=#d6d6d6
| 439820 ||  || — || October 14, 2007 || Mount Lemmon || Mount Lemmon Survey || — || align=right | 6.8 km || 
|-id=821 bgcolor=#E9E9E9
| 439821 ||  || — || May 9, 2006 || Mount Lemmon || Mount Lemmon Survey || — || align=right | 2.1 km || 
|-id=822 bgcolor=#fefefe
| 439822 ||  || — || February 17, 2007 || Kitt Peak || Spacewatch || — || align=right | 1.2 km || 
|-id=823 bgcolor=#E9E9E9
| 439823 ||  || — || November 20, 2008 || Kitt Peak || Spacewatch || — || align=right | 2.6 km || 
|-id=824 bgcolor=#E9E9E9
| 439824 ||  || — || September 17, 1998 || Kitt Peak || Spacewatch || — || align=right | 2.4 km || 
|-id=825 bgcolor=#d6d6d6
| 439825 ||  || — || September 27, 2006 || Kitt Peak || Spacewatch || — || align=right | 3.2 km || 
|-id=826 bgcolor=#E9E9E9
| 439826 ||  || — || September 12, 2007 || Catalina || CSS || — || align=right | 3.6 km || 
|-id=827 bgcolor=#d6d6d6
| 439827 ||  || — || March 31, 2009 || Mount Lemmon || Mount Lemmon Survey || — || align=right | 3.4 km || 
|-id=828 bgcolor=#fefefe
| 439828 ||  || — || April 6, 2011 || Mount Lemmon || Mount Lemmon Survey || — || align=right data-sort-value="0.95" | 950 m || 
|-id=829 bgcolor=#d6d6d6
| 439829 ||  || — || December 4, 2007 || Catalina || CSS || — || align=right | 3.2 km || 
|-id=830 bgcolor=#E9E9E9
| 439830 ||  || — || February 9, 2005 || Mount Lemmon || Mount Lemmon Survey || — || align=right | 2.3 km || 
|-id=831 bgcolor=#E9E9E9
| 439831 ||  || — || September 12, 1994 || Kitt Peak || Spacewatch || — || align=right | 1.2 km || 
|-id=832 bgcolor=#FA8072
| 439832 ||  || — || July 22, 1995 || Kitt Peak || Spacewatch || — || align=right data-sort-value="0.52" | 520 m || 
|-id=833 bgcolor=#fefefe
| 439833 ||  || — || September 29, 1995 || Kitt Peak || Spacewatch || — || align=right data-sort-value="0.70" | 700 m || 
|-id=834 bgcolor=#d6d6d6
| 439834 ||  || — || October 24, 1995 || Kitt Peak || Spacewatch || — || align=right | 1.9 km || 
|-id=835 bgcolor=#fefefe
| 439835 ||  || — || November 26, 1995 || Kitt Peak || Spacewatch || — || align=right data-sort-value="0.72" | 720 m || 
|-id=836 bgcolor=#d6d6d6
| 439836 ||  || — || October 5, 1996 || La Silla || E. W. Elst || — || align=right | 3.5 km || 
|-id=837 bgcolor=#E9E9E9
| 439837 ||  || — || March 3, 1997 || Kitt Peak || Spacewatch || — || align=right | 1.7 km || 
|-id=838 bgcolor=#E9E9E9
| 439838 ||  || — || April 10, 1997 || Kitt Peak || Spacewatch || JUN || align=right | 1.1 km || 
|-id=839 bgcolor=#fefefe
| 439839 ||  || — || May 28, 1997 || Kitt Peak || Spacewatch || — || align=right data-sort-value="0.81" | 810 m || 
|-id=840 bgcolor=#E9E9E9
| 439840 ||  || — || September 29, 1997 || Kitt Peak || Spacewatch || — || align=right | 1.5 km || 
|-id=841 bgcolor=#E9E9E9
| 439841 ||  || — || October 3, 1997 || Kitt Peak || Spacewatch || — || align=right | 2.1 km || 
|-id=842 bgcolor=#d6d6d6
| 439842 ||  || — || May 19, 1998 || Kitt Peak || Spacewatch || — || align=right | 2.4 km || 
|-id=843 bgcolor=#E9E9E9
| 439843 ||  || — || August 23, 1998 || Xinglong || SCAP || — || align=right | 1.3 km || 
|-id=844 bgcolor=#E9E9E9
| 439844 ||  || — || September 14, 1998 || Socorro || LINEAR || — || align=right | 1.7 km || 
|-id=845 bgcolor=#FA8072
| 439845 ||  || — || September 14, 1998 || Socorro || LINEAR || — || align=right data-sort-value="0.81" | 810 m || 
|-id=846 bgcolor=#E9E9E9
| 439846 ||  || — || September 20, 1998 || Kitt Peak || Spacewatch || (5) || align=right data-sort-value="0.89" | 890 m || 
|-id=847 bgcolor=#d6d6d6
| 439847 ||  || — || September 20, 1998 || Kitt Peak || Spacewatch || THM || align=right | 2.5 km || 
|-id=848 bgcolor=#FA8072
| 439848 ||  || — || September 26, 1998 || Socorro || LINEAR || — || align=right | 1.3 km || 
|-id=849 bgcolor=#E9E9E9
| 439849 ||  || — || October 14, 1998 || Catalina || CSS || — || align=right | 3.5 km || 
|-id=850 bgcolor=#E9E9E9
| 439850 ||  || — || October 14, 1998 || Socorro || LINEAR || — || align=right | 2.6 km || 
|-id=851 bgcolor=#fefefe
| 439851 ||  || — || November 16, 1998 || Kitt Peak || Spacewatch || — || align=right data-sort-value="0.86" | 860 m || 
|-id=852 bgcolor=#fefefe
| 439852 ||  || — || November 24, 1998 || Kitt Peak || Spacewatch || — || align=right data-sort-value="0.72" | 720 m || 
|-id=853 bgcolor=#fefefe
| 439853 ||  || — || December 8, 1998 || Kitt Peak || Spacewatch || — || align=right data-sort-value="0.64" | 640 m || 
|-id=854 bgcolor=#FFC2E0
| 439854 ||  || — || December 12, 1998 || Socorro || LINEAR || AMO || align=right data-sort-value="0.65" | 650 m || 
|-id=855 bgcolor=#E9E9E9
| 439855 ||  || — || December 8, 1998 || Kitt Peak || Spacewatch || JUN || align=right data-sort-value="0.97" | 970 m || 
|-id=856 bgcolor=#fefefe
| 439856 ||  || — || December 13, 1998 || Kitt Peak || Spacewatch || — || align=right data-sort-value="0.78" | 780 m || 
|-id=857 bgcolor=#E9E9E9
| 439857 ||  || — || November 14, 1998 || Kitt Peak || Spacewatch || GEF || align=right | 1.2 km || 
|-id=858 bgcolor=#C2E0FF
| 439858 ||  || — || July 19, 1999 || Mauna Kea || Mauna Kea Obs. || cubewano (cold)critical || align=right | 134 km || 
|-id=859 bgcolor=#d6d6d6
| 439859 ||  || — || September 4, 1999 || Kitt Peak || Spacewatch || THM || align=right | 1.5 km || 
|-id=860 bgcolor=#E9E9E9
| 439860 ||  || — || September 30, 1999 || Kitt Peak || Spacewatch || — || align=right data-sort-value="0.70" | 700 m || 
|-id=861 bgcolor=#E9E9E9
| 439861 ||  || — || September 30, 1999 || Kitt Peak || Spacewatch || ADE || align=right | 1.7 km || 
|-id=862 bgcolor=#E9E9E9
| 439862 ||  || — || October 3, 1999 || Kitt Peak || Spacewatch || (5) || align=right data-sort-value="0.66" | 660 m || 
|-id=863 bgcolor=#d6d6d6
| 439863 ||  || — || October 4, 1999 || Kitt Peak || Spacewatch || — || align=right | 2.9 km || 
|-id=864 bgcolor=#d6d6d6
| 439864 ||  || — || October 6, 1999 || Kitt Peak || Spacewatch || HYG || align=right | 2.6 km || 
|-id=865 bgcolor=#fefefe
| 439865 ||  || — || October 9, 1999 || Kitt Peak || Spacewatch || — || align=right data-sort-value="0.51" | 510 m || 
|-id=866 bgcolor=#d6d6d6
| 439866 ||  || — || October 2, 1999 || Kitt Peak || Spacewatch || — || align=right | 3.3 km || 
|-id=867 bgcolor=#d6d6d6
| 439867 ||  || — || November 6, 1999 || Kitt Peak || Spacewatch || — || align=right | 3.0 km || 
|-id=868 bgcolor=#E9E9E9
| 439868 ||  || — || November 9, 1999 || Socorro || LINEAR || — || align=right data-sort-value="0.97" | 970 m || 
|-id=869 bgcolor=#fefefe
| 439869 ||  || — || November 9, 1999 || Socorro || LINEAR || V || align=right data-sort-value="0.70" | 700 m || 
|-id=870 bgcolor=#E9E9E9
| 439870 ||  || — || November 9, 1999 || Socorro || LINEAR || — || align=right data-sort-value="0.75" | 750 m || 
|-id=871 bgcolor=#d6d6d6
| 439871 ||  || — || November 3, 1999 || Kitt Peak || Spacewatch || HYG || align=right | 2.5 km || 
|-id=872 bgcolor=#E9E9E9
| 439872 ||  || — || October 14, 1999 || Kitt Peak || Spacewatch || — || align=right data-sort-value="0.70" | 700 m || 
|-id=873 bgcolor=#fefefe
| 439873 ||  || — || November 10, 1999 || Kitt Peak || Spacewatch || — || align=right data-sort-value="0.65" | 650 m || 
|-id=874 bgcolor=#E9E9E9
| 439874 ||  || — || November 11, 1999 || Kitt Peak || Spacewatch || — || align=right data-sort-value="0.70" | 700 m || 
|-id=875 bgcolor=#E9E9E9
| 439875 ||  || — || November 14, 1999 || Socorro || LINEAR || (5) || align=right data-sort-value="0.87" | 870 m || 
|-id=876 bgcolor=#d6d6d6
| 439876 ||  || — || November 1, 1999 || Catalina || CSS || — || align=right | 2.8 km || 
|-id=877 bgcolor=#FFC2E0
| 439877 ||  || — || December 13, 1999 || Socorro || LINEAR || APOPHA || align=right data-sort-value="0.40" | 400 m || 
|-id=878 bgcolor=#E9E9E9
| 439878 ||  || — || December 7, 1999 || Kitt Peak || Spacewatch || — || align=right data-sort-value="0.68" | 680 m || 
|-id=879 bgcolor=#fefefe
| 439879 ||  || — || November 29, 1999 || Kitt Peak || Spacewatch || — || align=right data-sort-value="0.73" | 730 m || 
|-id=880 bgcolor=#FA8072
| 439880 ||  || — || December 13, 1999 || Kitt Peak || Spacewatch || — || align=right data-sort-value="0.79" | 790 m || 
|-id=881 bgcolor=#E9E9E9
| 439881 ||  || — || December 7, 1999 || Socorro || LINEAR || — || align=right | 1.7 km || 
|-id=882 bgcolor=#E9E9E9
| 439882 ||  || — || December 14, 1999 || Kitt Peak || Spacewatch || EUN || align=right | 1.2 km || 
|-id=883 bgcolor=#E9E9E9
| 439883 ||  || — || January 3, 2000 || Socorro || LINEAR || — || align=right | 2.4 km || 
|-id=884 bgcolor=#E9E9E9
| 439884 ||  || — || January 8, 2000 || Kitt Peak || Spacewatch || — || align=right | 1.6 km || 
|-id=885 bgcolor=#FA8072
| 439885 ||  || — || February 4, 2000 || Socorro || LINEAR || — || align=right data-sort-value="0.88" | 880 m || 
|-id=886 bgcolor=#E9E9E9
| 439886 ||  || — || May 26, 2000 || Socorro || LINEAR || — || align=right | 2.3 km || 
|-id=887 bgcolor=#FA8072
| 439887 ||  || — || June 30, 2000 || Haleakala || NEAT || — || align=right | 1.1 km || 
|-id=888 bgcolor=#fefefe
| 439888 ||  || — || July 3, 2000 || Kitt Peak || Spacewatch || — || align=right data-sort-value="0.66" | 660 m || 
|-id=889 bgcolor=#FFC2E0
| 439889 ||  || — || August 2, 2000 || Socorro || LINEAR || AMOcritical || align=right data-sort-value="0.59" | 590 m || 
|-id=890 bgcolor=#FA8072
| 439890 ||  || — || August 26, 2000 || Socorro || LINEAR || — || align=right data-sort-value="0.75" | 750 m || 
|-id=891 bgcolor=#fefefe
| 439891 ||  || — || September 2, 2000 || Anderson Mesa || LONEOS || — || align=right | 1.2 km || 
|-id=892 bgcolor=#fefefe
| 439892 ||  || — || September 23, 2000 || Socorro || LINEAR || — || align=right | 1.1 km || 
|-id=893 bgcolor=#fefefe
| 439893 ||  || — || September 20, 2000 || Haleakala || NEAT || — || align=right data-sort-value="0.74" | 740 m || 
|-id=894 bgcolor=#fefefe
| 439894 ||  || — || September 24, 2000 || Socorro || LINEAR || — || align=right | 1.0 km || 
|-id=895 bgcolor=#fefefe
| 439895 ||  || — || September 24, 2000 || Socorro || LINEAR || — || align=right data-sort-value="0.88" | 880 m || 
|-id=896 bgcolor=#d6d6d6
| 439896 ||  || — || September 29, 2000 || Kitt Peak || Spacewatch || — || align=right | 1.9 km || 
|-id=897 bgcolor=#fefefe
| 439897 ||  || — || October 2, 2000 || Socorro || LINEAR || H || align=right data-sort-value="0.88" | 880 m || 
|-id=898 bgcolor=#FFC2E0
| 439898 ||  || — || October 4, 2000 || Socorro || LINEAR || AMO || align=right data-sort-value="0.53" | 530 m || 
|-id=899 bgcolor=#fefefe
| 439899 ||  || — || October 3, 2000 || Socorro || LINEAR || — || align=right | 1.2 km || 
|-id=900 bgcolor=#E9E9E9
| 439900 ||  || — || November 19, 2000 || Socorro || LINEAR || EUN || align=right | 1.5 km || 
|}

439901–440000 

|-bgcolor=#fefefe
| 439901 ||  || — || November 20, 2000 || Socorro || LINEAR || — || align=right data-sort-value="0.73" | 730 m || 
|-id=902 bgcolor=#d6d6d6
| 439902 ||  || — || November 21, 2000 || Socorro || LINEAR || — || align=right | 3.1 km || 
|-id=903 bgcolor=#d6d6d6
| 439903 ||  || — || November 21, 2000 || Socorro || LINEAR || — || align=right | 4.1 km || 
|-id=904 bgcolor=#fefefe
| 439904 ||  || — || November 2, 2000 || Socorro || LINEAR || — || align=right data-sort-value="0.98" | 980 m || 
|-id=905 bgcolor=#fefefe
| 439905 ||  || — || November 20, 2000 || Socorro || LINEAR || — || align=right | 1.1 km || 
|-id=906 bgcolor=#FA8072
| 439906 ||  || — || October 1, 2000 || Socorro || LINEAR || — || align=right data-sort-value="0.76" | 760 m || 
|-id=907 bgcolor=#d6d6d6
| 439907 ||  || — || December 1, 2000 || Socorro || LINEAR || Tj (2.93) || align=right | 6.5 km || 
|-id=908 bgcolor=#FFC2E0
| 439908 ||  || — || December 15, 2000 || Socorro || LINEAR || AMO || align=right data-sort-value="0.50" | 500 m || 
|-id=909 bgcolor=#fefefe
| 439909 ||  || — || December 31, 2000 || Kitt Peak || Spacewatch || H || align=right data-sort-value="0.79" | 790 m || 
|-id=910 bgcolor=#FA8072
| 439910 ||  || — || December 5, 2000 || Socorro || LINEAR || H || align=right data-sort-value="0.80" | 800 m || 
|-id=911 bgcolor=#fefefe
| 439911 ||  || — || February 16, 2001 || Socorro || LINEAR || H || align=right data-sort-value="0.92" | 920 m || 
|-id=912 bgcolor=#fefefe
| 439912 ||  || — || March 19, 2001 || Socorro || LINEAR || — || align=right data-sort-value="0.89" | 890 m || 
|-id=913 bgcolor=#fefefe
| 439913 ||  || — || March 18, 2001 || Socorro || LINEAR || — || align=right | 1.2 km || 
|-id=914 bgcolor=#FA8072
| 439914 ||  || — || July 19, 2001 || Palomar || NEAT || — || align=right data-sort-value="0.71" | 710 m || 
|-id=915 bgcolor=#FA8072
| 439915 ||  || — || July 26, 2001 || Palomar || NEAT || — || align=right data-sort-value="0.73" | 730 m || 
|-id=916 bgcolor=#E9E9E9
| 439916 ||  || — || August 10, 2001 || Palomar || NEAT || — || align=right | 3.3 km || 
|-id=917 bgcolor=#E9E9E9
| 439917 ||  || — || August 17, 2001 || Socorro || LINEAR || — || align=right | 2.6 km || 
|-id=918 bgcolor=#E9E9E9
| 439918 ||  || — || August 17, 2001 || Socorro || LINEAR || — || align=right | 2.5 km || 
|-id=919 bgcolor=#FA8072
| 439919 ||  || — || August 20, 2001 || Socorro || LINEAR || critical || align=right data-sort-value="0.65" | 650 m || 
|-id=920 bgcolor=#fefefe
| 439920 ||  || — || August 25, 2001 || Socorro || LINEAR || — || align=right | 1.0 km || 
|-id=921 bgcolor=#fefefe
| 439921 ||  || — || August 25, 2001 || Socorro || LINEAR || — || align=right data-sort-value="0.94" | 940 m || 
|-id=922 bgcolor=#fefefe
| 439922 ||  || — || August 23, 2001 || Anderson Mesa || LONEOS || — || align=right data-sort-value="0.68" | 680 m || 
|-id=923 bgcolor=#fefefe
| 439923 ||  || — || August 23, 2001 || Anderson Mesa || LONEOS || — || align=right data-sort-value="0.82" | 820 m || 
|-id=924 bgcolor=#E9E9E9
| 439924 ||  || — || August 24, 2001 || Anderson Mesa || LONEOS || — || align=right | 2.2 km || 
|-id=925 bgcolor=#E9E9E9
| 439925 ||  || — || August 25, 2001 || Socorro || LINEAR || — || align=right | 2.8 km || 
|-id=926 bgcolor=#fefefe
| 439926 ||  || — || August 26, 2001 || Haleakala || NEAT || — || align=right data-sort-value="0.75" | 750 m || 
|-id=927 bgcolor=#fefefe
| 439927 ||  || — || August 16, 2001 || Socorro || LINEAR || — || align=right data-sort-value="0.62" | 620 m || 
|-id=928 bgcolor=#FA8072
| 439928 ||  || — || September 7, 2001 || Socorro || LINEAR || — || align=right data-sort-value="0.62" | 620 m || 
|-id=929 bgcolor=#fefefe
| 439929 ||  || — || September 7, 2001 || Socorro || LINEAR || — || align=right data-sort-value="0.71" | 710 m || 
|-id=930 bgcolor=#E9E9E9
| 439930 ||  || — || September 7, 2001 || Socorro || LINEAR || — || align=right | 2.0 km || 
|-id=931 bgcolor=#FA8072
| 439931 ||  || — || September 11, 2001 || Socorro || LINEAR || — || align=right data-sort-value="0.90" | 900 m || 
|-id=932 bgcolor=#fefefe
| 439932 ||  || — || September 12, 2001 || Socorro || LINEAR || — || align=right data-sort-value="0.79" | 790 m || 
|-id=933 bgcolor=#E9E9E9
| 439933 ||  || — || September 12, 2001 || Socorro || LINEAR || — || align=right | 2.7 km || 
|-id=934 bgcolor=#E9E9E9
| 439934 ||  || — || September 8, 2001 || Socorro || LINEAR || DOR || align=right | 2.4 km || 
|-id=935 bgcolor=#fefefe
| 439935 ||  || — || September 16, 2001 || Socorro || LINEAR || — || align=right data-sort-value="0.90" | 900 m || 
|-id=936 bgcolor=#FA8072
| 439936 ||  || — || September 16, 2001 || Socorro || LINEAR || — || align=right data-sort-value="0.90" | 900 m || 
|-id=937 bgcolor=#fefefe
| 439937 ||  || — || September 16, 2001 || Socorro || LINEAR || — || align=right data-sort-value="0.78" | 780 m || 
|-id=938 bgcolor=#E9E9E9
| 439938 ||  || — || September 16, 2001 || Socorro || LINEAR || — || align=right | 2.4 km || 
|-id=939 bgcolor=#fefefe
| 439939 ||  || — || September 19, 2001 || Socorro || LINEAR || — || align=right data-sort-value="0.68" | 680 m || 
|-id=940 bgcolor=#d6d6d6
| 439940 ||  || — || September 16, 2001 || Socorro || LINEAR || — || align=right | 2.1 km || 
|-id=941 bgcolor=#E9E9E9
| 439941 ||  || — || August 22, 2001 || Kitt Peak || Spacewatch || — || align=right | 2.0 km || 
|-id=942 bgcolor=#fefefe
| 439942 ||  || — || September 16, 2001 || Socorro || LINEAR || — || align=right data-sort-value="0.59" | 590 m || 
|-id=943 bgcolor=#fefefe
| 439943 ||  || — || September 17, 2001 || Socorro || LINEAR || — || align=right data-sort-value="0.84" | 840 m || 
|-id=944 bgcolor=#E9E9E9
| 439944 ||  || — || September 16, 2001 || Socorro || LINEAR || — || align=right | 2.6 km || 
|-id=945 bgcolor=#E9E9E9
| 439945 ||  || — || September 11, 2001 || Kitt Peak || Spacewatch || — || align=right | 2.3 km || 
|-id=946 bgcolor=#fefefe
| 439946 ||  || — || September 19, 2001 || Socorro || LINEAR || — || align=right data-sort-value="0.90" | 900 m || 
|-id=947 bgcolor=#fefefe
| 439947 ||  || — || September 23, 2001 || Goodricke-Pigott || R. A. Tucker || — || align=right data-sort-value="0.78" | 780 m || 
|-id=948 bgcolor=#E9E9E9
| 439948 ||  || — || September 20, 2001 || Socorro || LINEAR || — || align=right | 1.9 km || 
|-id=949 bgcolor=#fefefe
| 439949 ||  || — || September 20, 2001 || Socorro || LINEAR || — || align=right data-sort-value="0.62" | 620 m || 
|-id=950 bgcolor=#fefefe
| 439950 ||  || — || September 25, 2001 || Socorro || LINEAR || — || align=right data-sort-value="0.86" | 860 m || 
|-id=951 bgcolor=#fefefe
| 439951 ||  || — || September 20, 2001 || Socorro || LINEAR || — || align=right data-sort-value="0.59" | 590 m || 
|-id=952 bgcolor=#E9E9E9
| 439952 ||  || — || September 21, 2001 || Anderson Mesa || LONEOS || — || align=right | 2.1 km || 
|-id=953 bgcolor=#FA8072
| 439953 ||  || — || October 14, 2001 || Socorro || LINEAR || — || align=right data-sort-value="0.62" | 620 m || 
|-id=954 bgcolor=#fefefe
| 439954 ||  || — || October 14, 2001 || Socorro || LINEAR || — || align=right data-sort-value="0.89" | 890 m || 
|-id=955 bgcolor=#fefefe
| 439955 ||  || — || October 13, 2001 || Socorro || LINEAR || NYS || align=right data-sort-value="0.63" | 630 m || 
|-id=956 bgcolor=#fefefe
| 439956 ||  || — || October 14, 2001 || Socorro || LINEAR || — || align=right data-sort-value="0.65" | 650 m || 
|-id=957 bgcolor=#fefefe
| 439957 ||  || — || October 14, 2001 || Socorro || LINEAR || — || align=right | 1.2 km || 
|-id=958 bgcolor=#fefefe
| 439958 ||  || — || October 14, 2001 || Socorro || LINEAR || — || align=right data-sort-value="0.59" | 590 m || 
|-id=959 bgcolor=#fefefe
| 439959 ||  || — || October 14, 2001 || Socorro || LINEAR || — || align=right data-sort-value="0.84" | 840 m || 
|-id=960 bgcolor=#E9E9E9
| 439960 ||  || — || October 11, 2001 || Socorro || LINEAR || — || align=right | 2.5 km || 
|-id=961 bgcolor=#E9E9E9
| 439961 ||  || — || October 17, 2001 || Socorro || LINEAR || — || align=right | 2.0 km || 
|-id=962 bgcolor=#fefefe
| 439962 ||  || — || September 19, 2001 || Kitt Peak || Spacewatch || — || align=right data-sort-value="0.59" | 590 m || 
|-id=963 bgcolor=#d6d6d6
| 439963 ||  || — || October 22, 2001 || Socorro || LINEAR || — || align=right | 2.4 km || 
|-id=964 bgcolor=#fefefe
| 439964 ||  || — || October 23, 2001 || Socorro || LINEAR || critical || align=right data-sort-value="0.57" | 570 m || 
|-id=965 bgcolor=#fefefe
| 439965 ||  || — || October 23, 2001 || Socorro || LINEAR || — || align=right | 1.1 km || 
|-id=966 bgcolor=#fefefe
| 439966 ||  || — || October 23, 2001 || Socorro || LINEAR || — || align=right data-sort-value="0.90" | 900 m || 
|-id=967 bgcolor=#E9E9E9
| 439967 ||  || — || October 19, 2001 || Palomar || NEAT || AGN || align=right | 1.3 km || 
|-id=968 bgcolor=#E9E9E9
| 439968 ||  || — || October 16, 2001 || Palomar || NEAT || — || align=right | 1.9 km || 
|-id=969 bgcolor=#fefefe
| 439969 ||  || — || November 11, 2001 || Kitt Peak || Spacewatch || — || align=right data-sort-value="0.62" | 620 m || 
|-id=970 bgcolor=#d6d6d6
| 439970 ||  || — || November 9, 2001 || Socorro || LINEAR || — || align=right | 2.9 km || 
|-id=971 bgcolor=#d6d6d6
| 439971 ||  || — || November 9, 2001 || Socorro || LINEAR || — || align=right | 3.4 km || 
|-id=972 bgcolor=#fefefe
| 439972 ||  || — || November 9, 2001 || Socorro || LINEAR || (2076) || align=right data-sort-value="0.91" | 910 m || 
|-id=973 bgcolor=#fefefe
| 439973 ||  || — || October 14, 2001 || Socorro || LINEAR || — || align=right | 1.0 km || 
|-id=974 bgcolor=#FA8072
| 439974 ||  || — || November 21, 2001 || Socorro || LINEAR || — || align=right | 1.4 km || 
|-id=975 bgcolor=#fefefe
| 439975 ||  || — || November 18, 2001 || Socorro || LINEAR || critical || align=right data-sort-value="0.68" | 680 m || 
|-id=976 bgcolor=#fefefe
| 439976 ||  || — || November 17, 2001 || Socorro || LINEAR || — || align=right data-sort-value="0.75" | 750 m || 
|-id=977 bgcolor=#fefefe
| 439977 ||  || — || November 19, 2001 || Socorro || LINEAR || — || align=right data-sort-value="0.68" | 680 m || 
|-id=978 bgcolor=#fefefe
| 439978 ||  || — || November 20, 2001 || Socorro || LINEAR || — || align=right data-sort-value="0.89" | 890 m || 
|-id=979 bgcolor=#fefefe
| 439979 ||  || — || November 20, 2001 || Socorro || LINEAR || — || align=right data-sort-value="0.82" | 820 m || 
|-id=980 bgcolor=#fefefe
| 439980 ||  || — || November 20, 2001 || Socorro || LINEAR || NYS || align=right data-sort-value="0.69" | 690 m || 
|-id=981 bgcolor=#fefefe
| 439981 ||  || — || October 17, 2001 || Kitt Peak || Spacewatch || — || align=right data-sort-value="0.78" | 780 m || 
|-id=982 bgcolor=#fefefe
| 439982 ||  || — || November 19, 2001 || Socorro || LINEAR || — || align=right data-sort-value="0.70" | 700 m || 
|-id=983 bgcolor=#fefefe
| 439983 ||  || — || November 21, 2001 || Socorro || LINEAR || — || align=right | 1.7 km || 
|-id=984 bgcolor=#fefefe
| 439984 ||  || — || November 12, 2001 || Kitt Peak || Spacewatch || — || align=right data-sort-value="0.98" | 980 m || 
|-id=985 bgcolor=#d6d6d6
| 439985 ||  || — || December 11, 2001 || Socorro || LINEAR || — || align=right | 3.1 km || 
|-id=986 bgcolor=#fefefe
| 439986 ||  || — || December 11, 2001 || Socorro || LINEAR || — || align=right data-sort-value="0.90" | 900 m || 
|-id=987 bgcolor=#d6d6d6
| 439987 ||  || — || December 14, 2001 || Socorro || LINEAR || HIL3:2 || align=right | 6.4 km || 
|-id=988 bgcolor=#fefefe
| 439988 ||  || — || December 14, 2001 || Socorro || LINEAR || — || align=right data-sort-value="0.91" | 910 m || 
|-id=989 bgcolor=#fefefe
| 439989 ||  || — || November 9, 2001 || Socorro || LINEAR || — || align=right | 1.2 km || 
|-id=990 bgcolor=#fefefe
| 439990 ||  || — || December 15, 2001 || Socorro || LINEAR || — || align=right | 1.9 km || 
|-id=991 bgcolor=#fefefe
| 439991 ||  || — || December 17, 2001 || Socorro || LINEAR || — || align=right data-sort-value="0.84" | 840 m || 
|-id=992 bgcolor=#d6d6d6
| 439992 ||  || — || December 18, 2001 || Socorro || LINEAR || — || align=right | 2.6 km || 
|-id=993 bgcolor=#fefefe
| 439993 ||  || — || December 17, 2001 || Kitt Peak || Spacewatch || V || align=right data-sort-value="0.74" | 740 m || 
|-id=994 bgcolor=#FA8072
| 439994 ||  || — || January 5, 2002 || Socorro || LINEAR || — || align=right | 1.2 km || 
|-id=995 bgcolor=#d6d6d6
| 439995 ||  || — || January 8, 2002 || Socorro || LINEAR || 3:2 || align=right | 5.0 km || 
|-id=996 bgcolor=#fefefe
| 439996 ||  || — || January 9, 2002 || Socorro || LINEAR || — || align=right data-sort-value="0.98" | 980 m || 
|-id=997 bgcolor=#d6d6d6
| 439997 ||  || — || January 9, 2002 || Socorro || LINEAR || EOS || align=right | 2.8 km || 
|-id=998 bgcolor=#FA8072
| 439998 ||  || — || February 7, 2002 || Socorro || LINEAR || — || align=right | 1.6 km || 
|-id=999 bgcolor=#FA8072
| 439999 ||  || — || February 7, 2002 || Socorro || LINEAR || — || align=right | 1.8 km || 
|-id=000 bgcolor=#fefefe
| 440000 ||  || — || January 14, 2002 || Kitt Peak || Spacewatch || — || align=right | 1.0 km || 
|}

References

External links 
 Discovery Circumstances: Numbered Minor Planets (435001)–(440000) (IAU Minor Planet Center)

0439